= List of people who have accepted Golden Raspberry Awards =

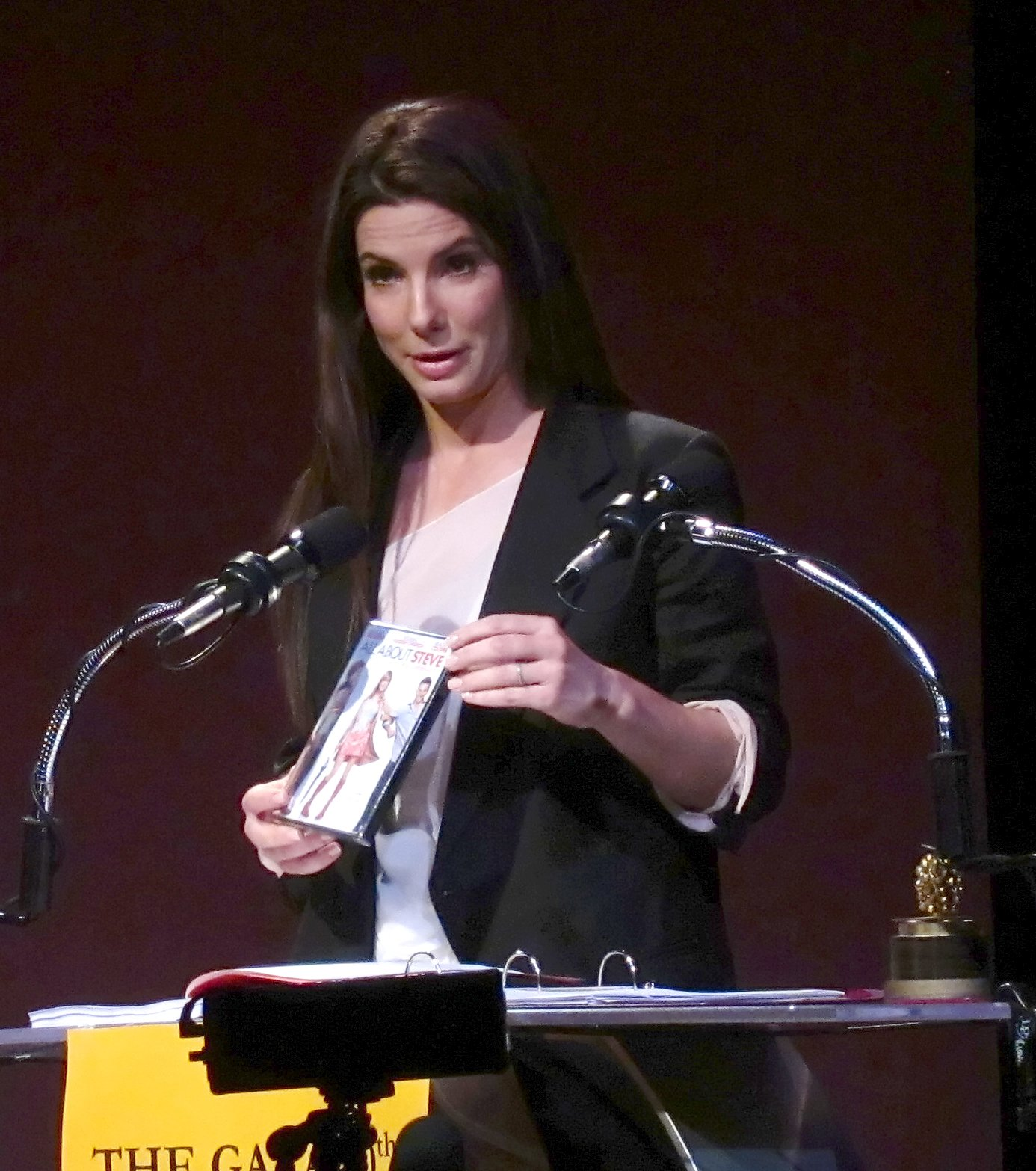
Sandra Bullock accepting her Golden Raspberry Award for Worst Actress for her performance in All About Steve, 2010. The following night, she won the Academy Award for Best Actress for The Blind Side.

With few exceptions, most winners neither attend the Golden Raspberry Awards ceremony nor personally accept their award, which single out the worst films of the year. According to Razzies tradition, the ceremony precedes the corresponding Academy Award function by one day.

Comedian Bill Cosby became the first to accept a Razzie award, presented during the Fox network Late Show in 1988 for his work on Leonard Part 6. Director Paul Verhoeven became the first recipient to claim an award in person, accepting both the Worst Picture and Worst Director awards for his 1995 film Showgirls. Screenwriter J. David Shapiro has twice accepted Razzie recognition for Battlefield Earth, in 2001 and 2010.

== List ==
Year	Image	Recipient	Category	Film	Attended ceremony?	Notes
1988	Bill Cosby	Bill Cosby	Worst Picture	Leonard Part 6	No	Bill Cosby was recognized at the 8th Golden Raspberry Awards with awards for Worst Picture, Worst Screenplay, and Worst Actor, for the 1987 film Leonard Part 6. Cosby became the first recipient to claim an award. Given that the actual Golden Raspberry trophies are spray-painted and deemed by the foundation as worth $4.97, Cosby wanted more, explaining that "I said to my publicist when I got the word, 'I want my Golden Raspberry and if it isn't golden, I'm going to the press.' My publicist called back and said they were upset, that they said they were just a little outfit operating out of one room. They tried to cop out. But if you take a big name and you say 'worst,' you have to perform. So they came up with the trophies and I got them on a show on the Fox network. It was a lot of fun to do, because they weren't serious and had never been called on it by anyone who got a Razzie." Arrangements were made to present Cosby with his awards on Fox's The Late Show. Fox made Cosby's awards out of 24-carat gold and Italian marble, which cost almost $30,000. He later showed his trophy on The Tonight Show.
1988	Bill Cosby	Bill Cosby	Worst Actor	Leonard Part 6	No	
1988	Bill Cosby	Bill Cosby	Worst Screenplay	Leonard Part 6	No	
1993	Tom Selleck	Tom Selleck	Worst Supporting Actor	Christopher Columbus: The Discovery	No	Tom Selleck accepted his award for Worst Supporting Actor for playing Ferdinand II of Aragon in the 1992 film Christopher Columbus: The Discovery. His award was presented to him when he appeared on The Chevy Chase Show.
1993	Alan Menken	Jack Feldman, Alan Menken	Worst Original Song	Newsies	No	Feldman requested his Razzie for "High Times, Hard Times" in 2016, so he could put it alongside the Tony Award he got for the stage adaptation of Newsies in his office. His composer partner Alan Menken has also spoken proudly of the Golden Raspberry, especially as he won it in the same weekend of his two Academy Awards for Aladdin. Menken eventually accepted his Razzie award in 2019, with an official acceptance video being posted by the foundation.
1996	Paul Verhoeven	Paul Verhoeven	Worst Picture	Showgirls	Yes	Paul Verhoeven was the first person to go to the ceremony to receive his awards; he accepted Worst Picture and Worst Director awards for the 1995 film Showgirls, at the awards ceremony at The Hollywood Roosevelt Hotel. The audience gave Verhoeven two standing ovations after he told them he was driven out of the Netherlands for being "sick and perverted and disgusting". He said he was glad he came to the United States and won an award for this work, "When I was making movies in Holland, they were blasted by critics as decadent, perverted and sleazy. Then I moved to the United States," said Verhoeven as the audience laughed. He commented, "I had the worst thing happen to me today. I got seven awards for being the worst, and it was more fun than reading the reviews (for Showgirls) in September," said Verhoeven while smiling at the audience.
1996	Paul Verhoeven	Paul Verhoeven	Worst Director	Showgirls	Yes	
1998	Brian Helgeland	Brian Helgeland	Worst Screenplay	The Postman	No	In 1998, Brian Helgeland accepted his award for Worst Screenplay for his work on the film The Postman. Helgeland learned of the award while being interviewed regarding his win at the Academy Award for Best Adapted Screenplay for L.A. Confidential that same weekend, and said he wanted to put his Oscar and his Razzie side-by-side to remind him of "the quixotic nature of Hollywood". Awards founder John J. B. Wilson presented Helgeland with the trophy at the recipient's Finestkind Productions office at Warner Bros. Helgeland read from a prepared statement, "I'm sure it would sound better in Latin, but it is truly better to be ridiculed than ignored. Indifference is the enemy and with this Razzie indifference has been defeated. My films are like my children, each special in some way. In the case of The Postman, I was perhaps an errant parent and therefore I am to blame. I wish, like Scrooge upon seeing Marley, I could blame it on a badly digested piece of meat. Alas, the blame rests upon my shoulders and I accept this award with humility, penance and above all, the sense of humor with which it is given. If I've learned anything from the year 1997, it is to not take any one film too seriously. I wish to thank John Wilson and I look forward to a time when the Razzies are given their own proper ceremony and national telecast. The world will be a better place with a few more laughs in it."
2001	J. David Shapiro	J. David Shapiro	Worst Screenplay	Battlefield Earth	No	John Wilson delivered Battlefield Earth's screenwriter J.D. Shapiro his award for Worst Screenplay at Mark Ebner's radio program. Shapiro commented that John Travolta had called the script "the Schindler's List of science fiction".
2002	Tom Green	Tom Green	Worst Picture	Freddy Got Fingered	Yes	Tom Green's 2001 film Freddy Got Fingered won in five categories at the 22nd Golden Raspberry Awards, including Worst Actor, Worst Director, Worst Picture, Worst Screen Couple, and Worst Screenplay. Green attended the awards in person, and brought with him a cheap red carpet which he unrolled as he entered the theater where the awards were being presented. "I'd just like to say to all the other nominees in the audience, I don't think that I deserve it any more than the rest of you. I'd like to say that. I don't think that it would be true, though," said Green. He had to be dragged off of the stage while accepting one of his awards because he would not stop playing the harmonica.
2002	Tom Green	Tom Green	Worst Director	Freddy Got Fingered	Yes	
2002	Tom Green	Tom Green	Worst Actor	Freddy Got Fingered	Yes	
2002	Tom Green	Tom Green	Worst Screenplay	Freddy Got Fingered	Yes	
2002	Tom Green	Tom Green	Worst Screen Couple	Freddy Got Fingered	Yes	
2004	Ben Affleck	Ben Affleck	Worst Actor	Gigli	No	At the 24th Golden Raspberry Awards, Ben Affleck was recognized in the Worst Actor category for his performances in films Gigli, Daredevil, and Paycheck. In early March 2004, Affleck joked on the radio, complaining he was "stiffed" because he had not been given his Worst Actor trophy. He said he should have at least been given "a golden sack of grapes". On March 16, 2004, Affleck was presented with his trophy in an appearance on Larry King Live. He commented, "It's a little cheap," and proceeded to pull the trophy apart while on the television program. The Golden Raspberry Award Foundation put the trophy up for bidding on eBay, where bidding rose to $967.97 from its initial $4.89 within 24 hours. "This is a classic case of life handing us lemons, our turning around and making lemonade. In this case, Razzberry lemonade," said John J.B. Wilson. The income of the trophy's sale was used to rent the Ivar Theater for the 2005 Razzies.
2004	Ben Affleck	Ben Affleck	Worst Actor	Daredevil	No	
2004	Ben Affleck	Ben Affleck	Worst Actor	Paycheck	No	
2005	Halle Berry	Halle Berry	Worst Actress	Catwoman	Yes	The 2004 film Catwoman received multiple dishonors at the 25th Golden Raspberry Awards, including Worst Picture, Worst Director, Worst Actress and Worst Screenplay. Halle Berry accepted her award for Worst Actress at the ceremony in person. Holding her Academy Award for her performance in Monster's Ball in one hand and her Golden Raspberry Award trophy in the other, Berry said to the audience at the ceremony, "Thank you so much. I never in my life thought I would be up here." She parodied her performance when she accepted her Academy Award, and thanked the film's director and her manager, "He loves me so much that he convinces me to do projects even when he knows that it is shit." Co-screenwriter Michael Ferris also accepted his award, and in his speech thanked the Golden Raspberry Foundation for boosting Catwoman's DVD sales. Julie Newmar, who portrayed Catwoman in the Batman TV series, received the film's Worst Picture award, and was told that she was the "best Catwoman".
2005	Halle Berry	Michael Ferris	Worst Screenplay	Catwoman	Yes	
2009	Uwe Boll	Uwe Boll	Worst Director	In the Name of the King: A Dungeon Siege Tale	No	At the 29th Golden Raspberry Awards, Uwe Boll was recognized in the Worst Director category for his films In the Name of the King: A Dungeon Siege Tale, Postal, and 1968 Tunnel Rats in addition to receiving the non-competitive/(dis)honorary Worst Career Achievement Award. Boll later posted a video from the set of his film Darfur in which he acknowledges his "win" and jokingly says that the Razzies destroyed his life, causing him to move to a hut in Sudan.
2009	Uwe Boll	Uwe Boll	Worst Director	Postal	No	At the 29th Golden Raspberry Awards, Uwe Boll was recognized in the Worst Director category for his films In the Name of the King: A Dungeon Siege Tale, Postal, and 1968 Tunnel Rats in addition to receiving the non-competitive/(dis)honorary Worst Career Achievement Award. Boll later posted a video from the set of his film Darfur in which he acknowledges his "win" and jokingly says that the Razzies destroyed his life, causing him to move to a hut in Sudan.
2009	Uwe Boll	Uwe Boll	Worst Director	1968 Tunnel Rats	No	At the 29th Golden Raspberry Awards, Uwe Boll was recognized in the Worst Director category for his films In the Name of the King: A Dungeon Siege Tale, Postal, and 1968 Tunnel Rats in addition to receiving the non-competitive/(dis)honorary Worst Career Achievement Award. Boll later posted a video from the set of his film Darfur in which he acknowledges his "win" and jokingly says that the Razzies destroyed his life, causing him to move to a hut in Sudan.
2009	Uwe Boll	Uwe Boll	Worst Career Achievement		No	At the 29th Golden Raspberry Awards, Uwe Boll was recognized in the Worst Director category for his films In the Name of the King: A Dungeon Siege Tale, Postal, and 1968 Tunnel Rats in addition to receiving the non-competitive/(dis)honorary Worst Career Achievement Award. Boll later posted a video from the set of his film Darfur in which he acknowledges his "win" and jokingly says that the Razzies destroyed his life, causing him to move to a hut in Sudan.
2010	Sandra Bullock	Sandra Bullock	Worst Actress	All About Steve	Yes	After her Worst Actress nomination for All About Steve, Sandra Bullock expressed interest in coming up to pick up her award. She eventually won, and showed up stating "I didn't realize that, in Hollywood, all you had to do was say you'd show up, and then you'd get the award. If I'd known that, I would have said I was appearing at the Oscars a long time ago." Bullock also brought DVD copies of All About Steve to the audience, declaring that the voters should watch the movie to see if she was really the worst performer, implying that the Razzie voters cast ballots for her based solely on her indications that she might appear at the ceremony. Bullock also said that her joint Worst Screen Couple victory with Bradley Cooper showed the voters did not watch the movie, since All About Steve is about a stalker and "that doesn't really set up the premise for a loving couple". Bullock also said she was escaping from a charity dinner with Jeffrey Katzenberg for the awards, and had to get there as soon as possible, "because you know, it's Jeffrey Katzenberg and he can basically prevent me from ever working again". John Wilson declared that her performance "was much better than the one you're about to see on the DVD". The organizers also did not allow Bullock to leave the ceremony with the trophy, given it was the only one they had. The following night, Bullock won the Academy Award for Best Actress for her performance in The Blind Side. Bullock would years later send fellow Worst Actress winner Dakota Johnson a voice mail telling "I heard you are in the Razzie club and we should have brunch".
2010	Sandra Bullock	Sandra Bullock	Worst Screen Couple	All About Steve	Yes	
2010	J. David Shapiro	J. David Shapiro	Worst Picture of the Decade	Battlefield Earth	Yes	In 2010, Shapiro appeared at the 30th Golden Raspberry Awards to accept Battlefield Earth's award for Worst Picture of the Decade, and during his speech even quoted a review by The New York Times: "Battlefield Earth is about the extinction of the human race, and after seeing this movie I'm all for it".
2011	David Eigenberg	David Eigenberg	Worst Screen Couple/Screen Ensemble	Sex and the City 2	No	After the ceremony, Eigenberg expressed interest in receiving the award in person; according to John Wilson, "He said that he had never won an award of any kind and if this was what he won, he would accept it." Eigenberg then collaborated with Wilson to make a humorous acceptance video which was posted on the official YouTube channel of the Golden Raspberry Awards.
2016	Jamie Dornan	Jamie Dornan	Worst Actor	Fifty Shades of Grey	No	Dornan was presented with one of the two awards in February 2018, during an appearance on Conan, while promoting the final film of the Fifty Shades trilogy, Fifty Shades Freed. He subsequently broke the top off his award, but quickly put it back together.
2016	Jamie Dornan	Jamie Dornan	Worst Screen Combo	Fifty Shades of Grey	No	Dornan was presented with one of the two awards in February 2018, during an appearance on Conan, while promoting the final film of the Fifty Shades trilogy, Fifty Shades Freed. He subsequently broke the top off his award, but quickly put it back together.
2017	Dinesh D'Souza	Dinesh D'Souza	Worst Picture	Hillary's America: The Secret History of the Democratic Party	No	Dinesh D'Souza was recognized at the 37th Golden Raspberry Awards with awards Worst Picture, Worst Director, and Worst Actor, for the 2016 documentary Hillary's America: The Secret History of the Democratic Party. He appeared in the video announcing the award winners, accepting the Razzies his documentary had received. D'Souza mockingly stated, "The reason you are giving it to me is because you are very upset that Trump won. You haven't gotten over it, you probably never will" and "This kind of award is really good for my career. See, if I'd gotten an Oscar, I'd be done. I couldn't make another movie, my audience wouldn't even show up. They'd have think I would have become one of you." He helps conclude the video by saying "To win a Razzie, being dissed by you guys? This is absolutely fantastic. My audience loves the fact that you hate me. Thank you." The Golden Raspberry Foundation also sent D'Souza all three trophies at his request.
2017	Dinesh D'Souza	Dinesh D'Souza	Worst Director	Hillary's America: The Secret History of the Democratic Party	No	
2017	Dinesh D'Souza	Dinesh D'Souza	Worst Actor	Hillary's America: The Secret History of the Democratic Party	No	
2018	Dwayne Johnson	Dwayne Johnson	The Razzie Nominee So Rotten You Loved It	Baywatch	No	At the 38th Golden Raspberry Awards, Baywatch was recognized with the special award, for The Razzie Nominee So Rotten You Loved It. The day after the Razzies ceremony, Dwayne Johnson, who was the star and producer of the film, posted a video to Twitter saying that he humbly accepts the award. Johnson would also be sent his trophy.
2025		Francis Ford Coppola	Worst Director	Megalopolis	No	Coppola accepted his award via Instagram one day prior to the ceremony, stating in a caption, "In this wreck of a world today, where ART is given scores as if it were professional wrestling, I chose to NOT follow the gutless rules laid down by an industry so terrified of risk that despite the enormous pool of young talent at its disposal, may not create pictures that will be relevant and alive 50 years from now." His film, Megalopolis, was also nominated for Worst Picture, and Worst Screenplay.
2025		Lady Gaga	Worst Screen Combo (Note: Jointly nominated with Joaquin Phoenix.)	Joker: Folie à Deux	No	Lady Gaga received nominations for her role in Joker: Folie à Deux in the categories of Worst Actress and Worst Screen Combo, "winning" the latter. Hosting an episode of Saturday Night Live in March 2025, Lady Gaga made reference to the award during her opening monologue, saying "I’ve been very diligent about selecting films that would showcase my craft as a serious actor. Films such as Joker 2. Apparently, people thought it was awesome. Joaquin and I even got nominated for a Razzie, which is an award for the worst film of the year. We won for Worst On-Screen Duo, but joke’s on them: I love winning things. And my Razzie brings me closer to an EGORT. It’s like an EGOT, but it’s hurtful." Gaga went on to vow to "not do Joker 3" during the same monologue.
2025		Dakota Johnson	Worst Actress	Madame Web	No	On the Good Hang podcast with Amy Poehler, Johnson told Poehler about winning the award and said she did accept it, asking the Razzies to send her the award.

== See also ==
- John J. B. Wilson – American publicist (born 1954)
- The Official Razzie Movie Guide – 2005 book by John J. B. Wilson
