= Golden Raspberry Awards =

Awards presented in recognition of the worst in film

Golden Raspberry Award
- Previous: 46th Golden Raspberry Awards; March 14, 2026
- Awarded for: Worst in film
- Country: United States
- Presented by: Golden Raspberry Award Foundation
- First award: March 31, 1981; 45 years ago
- Website: razzies.com

Most recent Golden Raspberry Award winners
- Worst in films in 2025
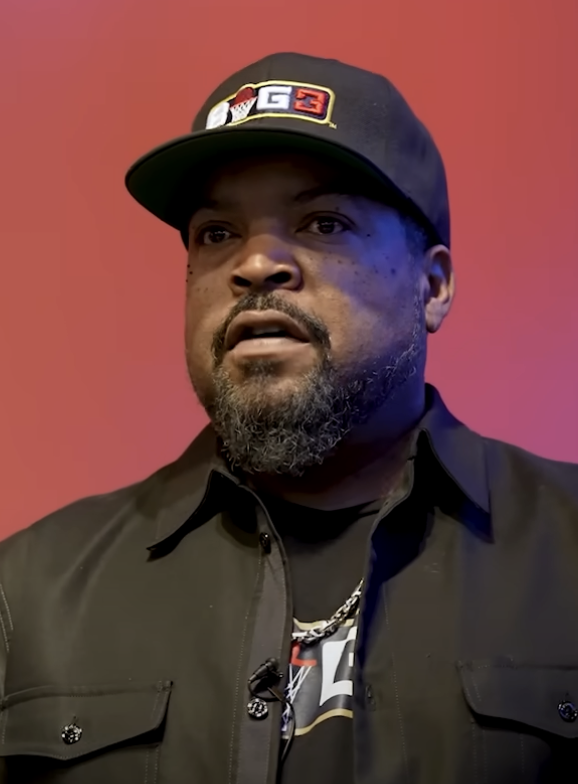

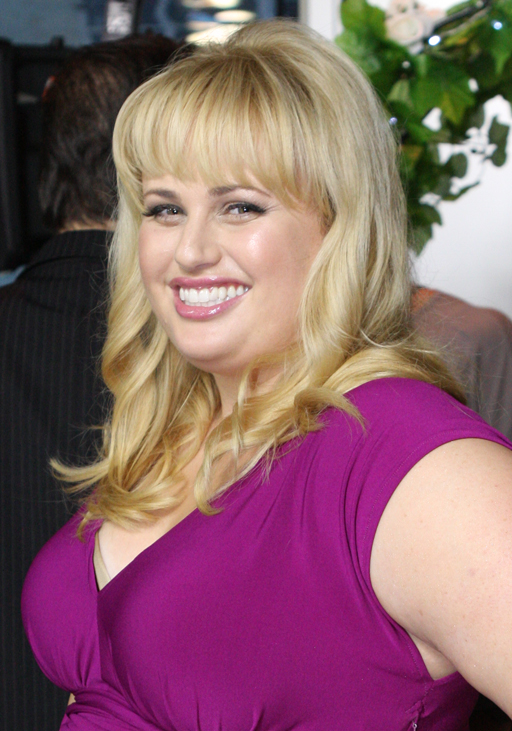

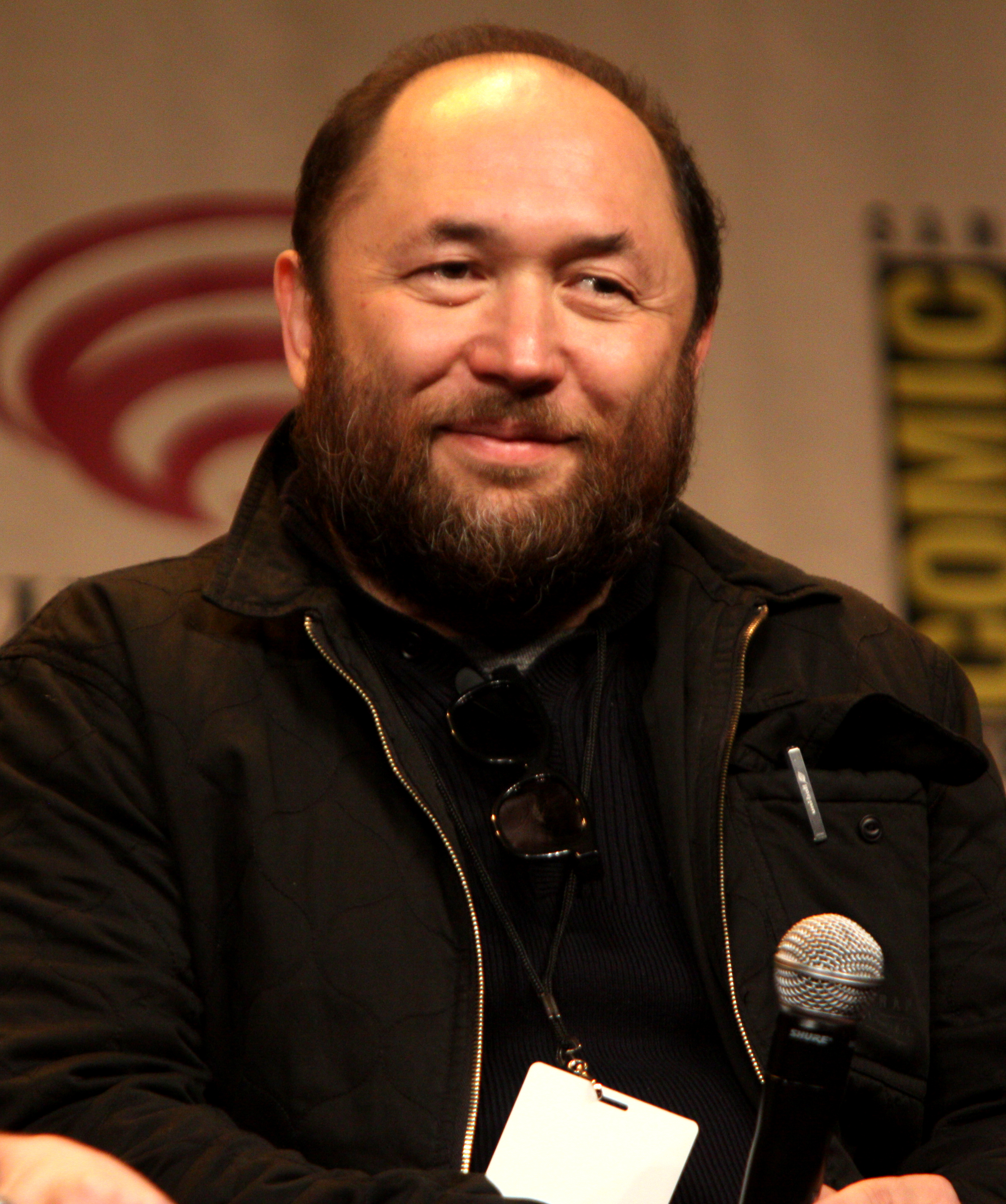
Award	Worst Actor	Worst Actress
Winner	Ice Cube (War of the Worlds)	Rebel Wilson (Bride Hard)
Award	Worst Supporting Actor	Worst Supporting Actress
Winner	All seven artificial dwarfs (Snow White)	Scarlet Rose Stallone (Gunslingers)
Award	Worst Picture	Worst Director
Winner	Timur Bekmambetov (War of the Worlds)	Rich Lee (War of the Worlds)
Previous Worst Picture
Madame Web
Worst Picture
War of the Worlds

The Golden Raspberry Awards, commonly known as the Razzie Awards or simply the Razzies, are parody awards presented for the worst films and performances of the year. Co-founded by UCLA film graduates and film industry veterans John J. B. Wilson and Mo Murphy, the annual satirical ceremony was created as a tongue-in-cheek counterpart to the Academy Awards, which predates it by about five decades. The term raspberry is used in its irreverent sense, as in "blowing a raspberry". The award statuette consists of a golf ball-sized raspberry mounted on a Super 8 mm film reel, which sits atop a 35 mm film core wrapped in brown wood-grain shelf paper and placed on a gold-painted jar lid. The Golden Raspberry Foundation has said the award "encourages well-known filmmakers and top-notch performers to own their badness".

The 1st ceremony was held on March 31, 1981, in John J. B. Wilson's living room alcove in Hollywood, honoring the worst films of the 1980 film season. Sylvester Stallone has won the most Razzies, with 12.

== History ==
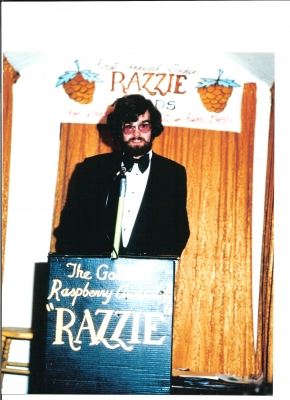
John J. B. Wilson at the 1st Golden Raspberry Awards in LA in 1981

American publicist John J. B. Wilson went to see a 99-cent double feature of Can't Stop the Music and Xanadu and thought on his drive home that those movies deserved awards for their low quality, and subsequently started thinking of all the other films that disappointed him in 1980, particularly as he had watched hundreds of productions in his job making trailers. The following year during a potluck party held at his home in Hollywood on the night of the 53rd Academy Awards, Wilson passed ballots regarding the worst in film to the attendees, and invited his friends to give random award presentations in his living room. Wilson stood at a lectern made of cardboard in a tacky tuxedo, with a foam ball attached to a broomstick as a fake microphone, and announced Can't Stop the Music as the first Golden Raspberry Award Winner for Worst Picture. The impromptu ceremony was a success and the following week a press release about his event was picked up by a few local newspapers, including a mention in the Los Angeles Daily News with the headline: "Take These Envelopes, Please".

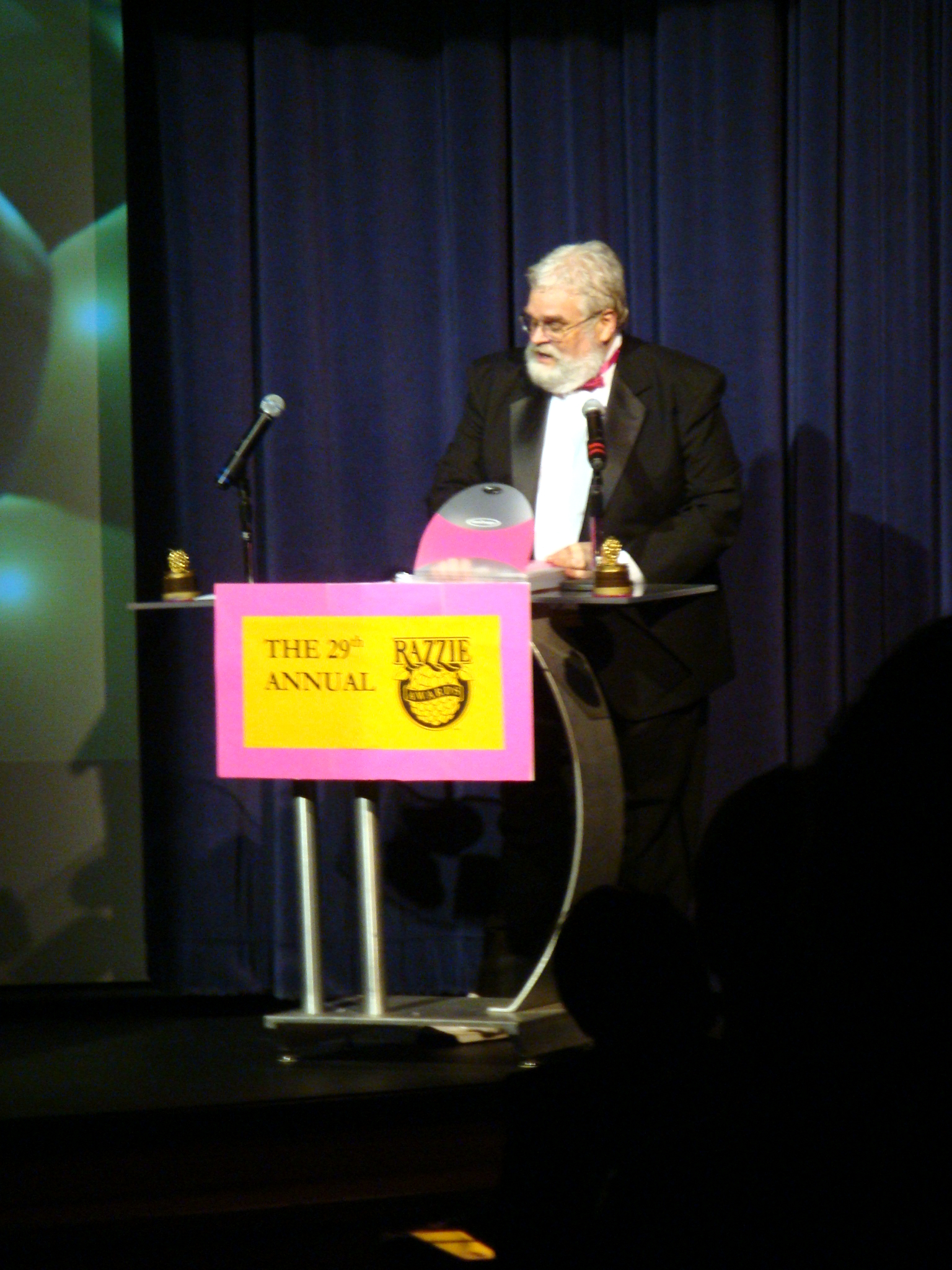
John J. B. Wilson at the 29th Golden Raspberry Awards in 2009

Approximately three dozen people came to the 1st Golden Raspberry Awards. The 2nd Golden Raspberry Awards had double the attendance, and the 3rd awards ceremony had doubled that number. By the 4th Golden Raspberry Awards ceremony, CNN and two major wire services covered the event. Wilson realized that by scheduling the Golden Raspberry Awards prior to the Academy Awards, the ceremony would get more press coverage: "We finally figured out you couldn't compete with the Oscars on Oscar night, but if you went the night before, when the press from all over the world are here and they are looking for something to do, it could well catch on," he said to BBC News.

In 2022, a dedicated award category, Worst Bruce Willis Performance in a 2021 Movie, was created after Bruce Willis starred in a number of poorly received low-budget films. On March 30 of that year, Willis's family announced that he had been diagnosed with aphasia. The Golden Raspberry Awards subsequently retracted the award category, saying it was inappropriate to award a Golden Raspberry to someone whose performance was affected by a medical condition. At the same time, the Awards retroactively retracted their 1980 Worst Actress nomination of Shelley Duvall in The Shining, stating "We have since discovered that Duvall's performance was impacted by Stanley Kubrick's treatment of her throughout the production". In 2023, following backlash for nominating 12-year-old Ryan Kiera Armstrong for Worst Actress, the Golden Raspberry Awards rescinded the nomination and said individuals under age 18 would no longer be nominated. The Razzies themselves later won the category for the blunder.

== Format ==
The Golden Raspberry Award statuette

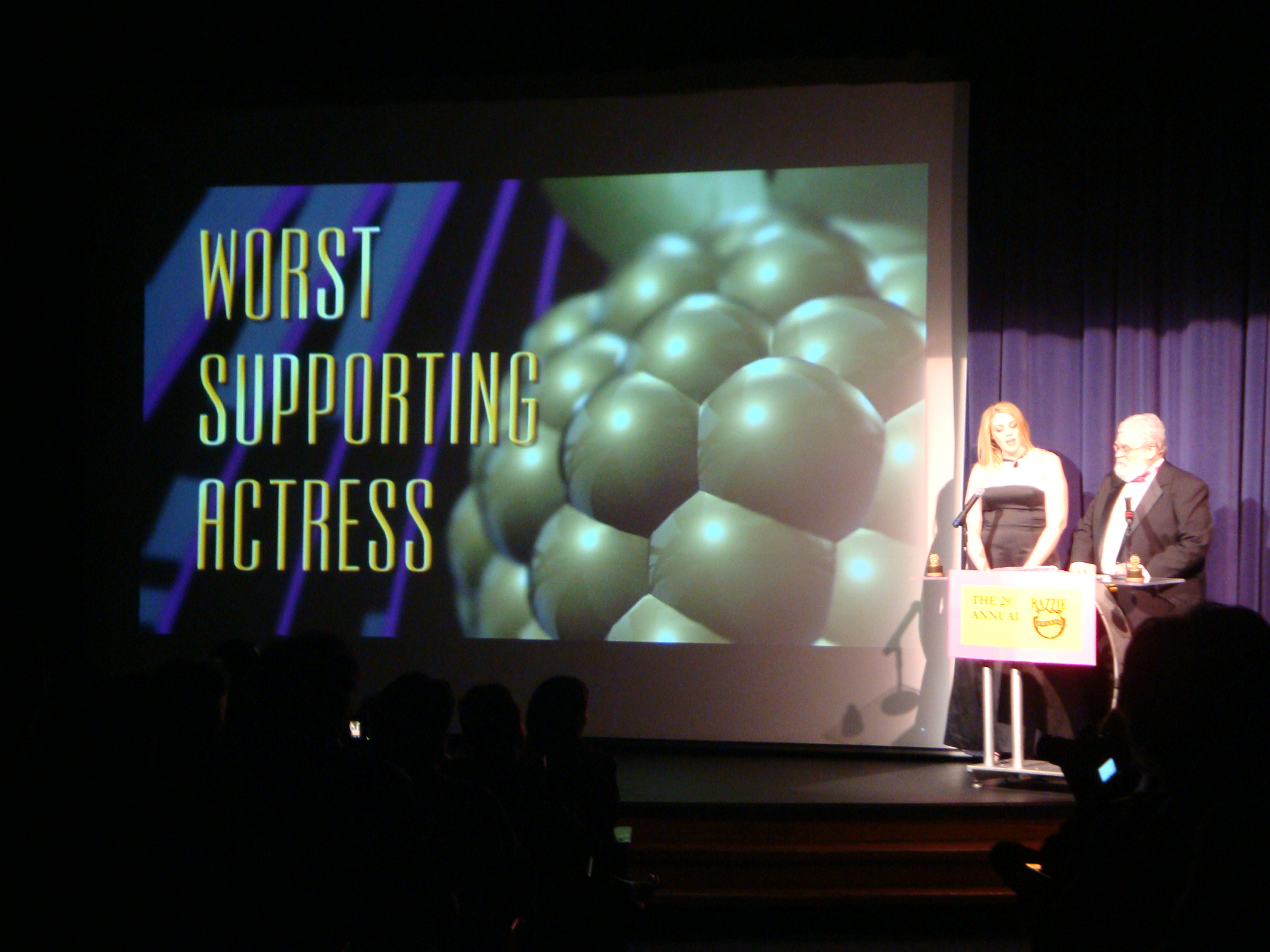
Worst Supporting Actress at the 29th Golden Raspberry Awards

Members of the Golden Raspberry Award Organization pay for membership, and number 650 from 19 countries. The ceremonies have generally been scheduled with both nominations and awards revealed in the day before the Academy Awards with only two exceptions; the 32nd Golden Raspberry Awards had the nominees announced the day before the Academy Award nominees but the ceremony took place on April 1, and the milestone 40th Golden Raspberry Awards, the ceremonies of which were cancelled due to the COVID-19 pandemic with the winners revealed online.

== Recipients who have accepted their award ==
Paul Verhoeven was the first person to go to the ceremony in 1996 to receive his award in the category Worst Director for the movie Showgirls. Other recipients who have accepted their Golden Raspberry Award include Bill Cosby, who became the first to accept a Razzie award, but which was presented to him in The Late Show in 1988 for his work on Leonard Part 6 (Worst Picture/Worst Screenplay/Worst Actor), Tom Green (Worst Actor/Worst Director), Halle Berry and Sandra Bullock (Worst Actress), Michael Ferris and J. D. Shapiro (Worst Screenplay), Alan Menken (Worst Original Song), Dinesh D'Souza (Worst Director), and Fifty Shades of Grey producers Dana Brunetti and Michael De Luca.

== Contenders for worst and best ==
Several people and/or films have received Razzie nominations while simultaneously receiving award nominations and other cultural honors from different organizations, sometimes for the same work or role.

=== Razzie and Oscar ===
Three people have won both a Razzie and an Oscar the same weekend: composer Alan Menken in 1993, screenwriter Brian Helgeland in 1997, and actress Sandra Bullock in 2010, though all three won for different films (for example, Helgeland won a Razzie for The Postman and an Oscar for L.A. Confidential). Three actors have received Oscar and Razzie acting nominations for the same role: James Coco (Only When I Laugh), Amy Irving (Yentl), and Glenn Close (Hillbilly Elegy).

Nineteen Worst Picture nominees have been nominated for an Oscar (with only four of them "winning" the Worst Picture Razzie), with Pearl Harbor being the only film in 2002 that won in any Oscars category, namely Best Sound Editing.

Disney's The Hunchback of Notre Dame became the first and so far only animated film to be nominated for both an Oscar and a Razzie. The film was nominated for Worst Written Film Grossing Over $100 Million at the 17th ceremony, but it was also nominated for Academy Award for Best Original Musical or Comedy Score at the 69th Academy Awards.

Blonde became the first NC-17 rated film to be nominated for an Oscar and a Razzie. The film was nominated for the most Razzies with eight at the 43rd ceremony: winning only two (including Worst Picture and Worst Screenplay), while the film's main star Ana de Armas was nominated for the Academy Award for Best Actress at the 95th Academy Awards.

As of 2024, 77 films have been nominated for both an Oscar and a Razzie. Only one film, Wall Street, has won both awards, with Michael Douglas winning the Academy Award for Best Actor, and Daryl Hannah winning the Golden Raspberry Award for Worst Supporting Actress.

=== Razzie and Tony ===
Newsies was nominated for Worst Picture at the 1993 ceremony, and Alan Menken won Worst Original Song for "High Times, Hard Times". The 2011 stage adaptation, which did not include "High Times, Hard Times", was nominated for the Tony Award for Best Musical, and Menken won Best Original Score.

== Categories ==
Current Awards

- Worst Picture: 1980 to present
- Worst Director: 1980 to present
- Worst Actor: 1980 to present
- Worst Actress: 1980 to present
- Worst Supporting Actor: 1980 to present
- Worst Supporting Actress: 1980 to present
- Worst Screenplay: 1980 to present
- Worst Remake, Rip-off or Sequel: 1994 to present, except 1996 and 1999
- Worst Screen Combo: 2013 to present
- Razzie Redeemer Award: 2014 to present, except 2021

Retired

- Worst Original Song: 1980 to 1999, 2002
- Worst New Star: 1981 to 1998, except 1989
- Worst Musical Score: 1981 to 1985
- Worst Visual Effects: 1986 to 1987
- Worst Screen Couple: 1994 to 2009, 2011 to 2012
- Worst Screen Couple/Worst Screen Ensemble: 2010
- Worst Screen Ensemble: 2011 to 2012

=== Special categories ===
Special categories have also been introduced for specific years. Such special awards include:

Year	Category	Winner	Nominees
1996	Worst Written Film Grossing Over $100 Million	Twister—Michael Crichton & Anne-Marie Martin	The Hunchback of Notre Dame—Tab Murphy, Irene Mecchi, Bob Tzudiker & Noni White; Independence Day—Dean Devlin & Roland Emmerich; Mission: Impossible—David Koepp and Robert Towne; A Time to Kill—Akiva Goldsman
1997	Worst Reckless Disregard for Human Life and Public Property	Con Air	Batman & Robin; The Lost World: Jurassic Park; Turbulence; Volcano
2019	Worst Reckless Disregard for Human Life and Public Property	Rambo: Last Blood	Dragged Across Concrete; The Haunting of Sharon Tate; Hellboy; Joker
1998	Worst Movie Trends of the Year	Gidgets 'n' geezers (58-year-old leading men wooing 28-year-old leading ladies)	If you've seen the trailer, why bother to see the movie?!? (previews that give away the film's entire plot); 30 minutes of story – conveyed in less than three hours! (l-o-n-g-e-r movies... shorter plots); THX: The audio is deafening! (movie sound so loud it constitutes assault with a deafening weapon); Yo quiero tacky tie-ins! (Mega-zillion-dollar cross-promotional overkill: Armageddon, Godzilla, etc.)
2002	Most Flatulent Teen-Targeted Movie	Jackass: The Movie	Eight Crazy Nights; Crossroads; Scooby-Doo; XXX
2003	Worst Excuse for an Actual Movie (All Concept/No Content)	The Cat in the Hat	2 Fast 2 Furious; Charlie's Angels: Full Throttle; From Justin to Kelly; The Real Cancun
2005	Most Tiresome Tabloid Targets	Tom Cruise, his baby (Suri Cruise), Katie Holmes, Oprah Winfrey's couch and the Eiffel Tower	Tom Cruise and his anti-psychiatry rant Paris Hilton and... "who EVER!"; Mr. and Mrs. Britney, their baby (Sean Preston Federline) and their camcorder The Simpsons: Ashlee, Jessica and Nick
2006	Worst Excuse for Family Entertainment	RV	Deck the Halls; Garfield: A Tail of Two Kitties; The Santa Clause 3: The Escape Clause; The Shaggy Dog
2007	Worst Excuse for a Horror Movie	I Know Who Killed Me	Aliens vs. Predator: Requiem; Captivity; Hannibal Rising; Hostel: Part II
2010	Worst Eye-Gouging Misuse of 3D	The Last Airbender	Cats & Dogs: The Revenge of Kitty Galore; Clash of the Titans; The Nutcracker; Saw 3D
2017	The Razzie Nominee So Rotten You Loved It	Baywatch	The Emoji Movie; Fifty Shades Darker; The Mummy; Transformers: The Last Knight
2021	Worst Bruce Willis Performance in a 2021 Movie (Note: The category was retracted after the disclosure of Bruce Willis having aphasia.)	Cosmic Sin	American Siege; Apex; Deadlock; Fortress; Midnight in the Switchgrass; Out of Death; Survive the Game

==== Anniversary awards ====
Every decade-closing ceremony (except in 2020, due to the COVID-19 pandemic resulting in the cancelation of the 40th Golden Raspberry Awards) includes an award for the worst actors and movies of the decade—though the 2000 ceremony put the actors as worst of the 20th century instead. Special prizes for the 25th anniversary of the Razzies awards were also given out in 2005.

Period/Ceremony	Category	Winner	Nominees
1980s (10th)	Worst Actor	Sylvester Stallone	Christopher Atkins; Ryan O'Neal; Prince; John Travolta
1980s (10th)	Worst Actress	Bo Derek	Faye Dunaway; Madonna; Brooke Shields; Pia Zadora
1980s (10th)	Worst Picture of the Decade	Mommie Dearest (1981)	Bolero (1984); Howard the Duck (1986); The Lonely Lady (1983); Star Trek V: The Final Frontier (1989)
1980s (10th)	Worst New Star of the Decade	Pia Zadora	Christopher Atkins; Madonna; Prince; Diana Scarwid
1990s (20th)	Worst Actor of the Century	Sylvester Stallone	Kevin Costner; Prince; William Shatner; Pauly Shore
1990s (20th)	Worst Actress of the Century	Madonna	Elizabeth Berkley; Bo Derek; Brooke Shields; Pia Zadora
1990s (20th)	Worst Picture of the Decade	Showgirls (1995)	An Alan Smithee Film: Burn Hollywood Burn (1998); Hudson Hawk (1991); The Postman (1997); Striptease (1996)
1990s (20th)	Worst New Star of the Decade	Pauly Shore	Elizabeth Berkley; Ahmed Best; Sofia Coppola; Dennis Rodman
Of Our First 25 Years (25th)	Worst Razzie Loser	Arnold Schwarzenegger	Kim Basinger; Angelina Jolie; Ryan O'Neal; Keanu Reeves
Of Our First 25 Years (25th)	Worst Drama	Battlefield Earth (2000)	The Lonely Lady (1983); Mommie Dearest (1981); Showgirls (1995); Swept Away (2002)
Of Our First 25 Years (25th)	Worst Comedy	Gigli (2003)	The Adventures of Pluto Nash (2002); The Cat in the Hat (2003); Freddy Got Fingered (2001); Leonard Part 6 (1987)
Of Our First 25 Years (25th)	Worst Musical	From Justin to Kelly (2003)	Can't Stop the Music (1980); Glitter (2001); Rhinestone (1984); Spice World (1998); Xanadu (1980)
2000s (30th)	Worst Actor of the Decade	Eddie Murphy	Ben Affleck; Mike Myers; Rob Schneider; John Travolta
2000s (30th)	Worst Actress of the Decade	Paris Hilton	Mariah Carey; Lindsay Lohan; Jennifer Lopez; Madonna
2000s (30th)	Worst Picture of the Decade	Battlefield Earth (2000)	Freddy Got Fingered (2001); Gigli (2003); I Know Who Killed Me (2007); Swept Away (2002)

== Other types of awards ==
=== Razzie Redeemer Award ===
The Razzie Redeemer Award is presented to a former nominee or winner who has subsequently made a comeback from critical or commercial failure. The award was introduced in 2014. Winners include Ben Affleck, Sylvester Stallone, Mel Gibson, Melissa McCarthy, Eddie Murphy, Will Smith, Colin Farrell, Pamela Anderson and Kate Hudson.

Some of the winners are not necessarily tied to films or specific people. Two notable examples include "A Safe Hollywood Haven" winning in 2017 for the film industry's response to the #MeToo movement and Fran Drescher winning in 2023 due to her role as the president of SAG-AFTRA during the 2023 SAG-AFTRA strike.

=== Worst Career Achievement ===
This award has been given five times, to Ronald Reagan in 1981, to Linda Blair in 1983, to Irwin Allen in 1985, to "Bruce the Rubber Shark" from Jaws in 1987, and to director Uwe Boll in 2009 who received this for his achievement as "Germany's answer to Ed Wood".

=== Governor's Award ===
This is a special award given by Razzie Award Governor John J. B. Wilson to an individual whose achievements are not covered by the Razzies' other categories. It was awarded in 2003 to Travis Payne for "Distinguished Under-Achievement in Choreography" in the film From Justin to Kelly. It would again be awarded in 2021 to the year 2020 for "The Worst Calendar Year EVER!"

=== Barry L. Bumstead Award ===
This award is given to movies with particularly high budgets that bombed at the box office. It was awarded in 2015 to United Passions, to Misconduct in 2016, in 2017 to CHiPs and in 2018 to Billionaire Boys Club.

== Records ==
=== By films in a single year ===
The following nominees received at least 10 nominations in a single year:

Nominations	Title
13	Showgirls
12	Jack and Jill
11	Batman & Robin
11	The Lonely Lady
11	The Twilight Saga: Breaking Dawn – Part 2
10	Butterfly
10	Transformers: The Last Knight

The following winners received at least 5 awards in a single year:

Awards	Title
10	Jack and Jill
7	Battlefield Earth
7	I Know Who Killed Me
7	Showgirls
7	The Twilight Saga: Breaking Dawn – Part 2
6	Bolero
6	Cats
6	Gigli
6	The Lonely Lady
6	Striptease
5	Mommie Dearest
5	Rocky IV
5	Under the Cherry Moon
5	The Postman
5	An Alan Smithee Film: Burn Hollywood Burn
5	Wild Wild West
5	Freddy Got Fingered
5	Swept Away
5	The Last Airbender
5	Fifty Shades of Grey
5	Diana: The Musical
5	Winnie-the-Pooh: Blood and Honey
5	War of the Worlds

=== By films overall ===
The following nominees received at least 10 nominations overall:

Nominations	Title
16	Showgirls
14	The Lonely Lady
12	Jack and Jill
11	Batman & Robin
11	Battlefield Earth
11	The Twilight Saga: Breaking Dawn – Part 2
10	Butterfly
10	Gigli
10	Swept Away
10	Transformers: The Last Knight

The following winners received at least 6 awards overall:

Awards	Title
10	Jack and Jill
9	Battlefield Earth
8	Showgirls
7	I Know Who Killed Me
7	Gigli
7	The Twilight Saga: Breaking Dawn – Part 2
6	Mommie Dearest
6	Bolero
6	Cats
6	The Lonely Lady
6	Striptease

=== By franchise ===
The following franchises received at least 3 nominations overall:

Nominations	Title	Ceremonies	Movies
7	Batman	13th, 16th, 18th, 26th, 37th, 40th, 45th	Batman Returns, Batman Forever, Batman & Robin, Batman Begins, Batman v Superman: Dawn of Justice, Joker, Joker: Folie à Deux
5	Superman	4th, 5th, 8th, 27th, 37th	Superman III, Supergirl, Superman IV: The Quest for Peace, Superman Returns, Batman v Superman: Dawn of Justice
5	Transformers (film series)	28th, 30th, 32nd, 35th, 38th	Transformers, Transformers: Revenge of the Fallen, Transformers: Dark of the Moon, Transformers: Age of Extinction, Transformers: The Last Knight
4	Jurassic Park (franchise)	18th, 22nd, 39th, 43rd	The Lost World: Jurassic Park, Jurassic Park III, Jurassic World: Fallen Kingdom, Jurassic World Dominion
4	Star Wars	20th, 23rd, 26th, 29th	Star Wars: Episode I - The Phantom Menace, Star Wars: Episode II – Attack of the Clones, Star Wars: Episode III - Revenge of the Sith, Star Wars: The Clone Wars
4	The Twilight Saga (film series)	30th, 31st, 32nd, 33rd	The Twilight Saga: New Moon, The Twilight Saga: Eclipse, The Twilight Saga: Breaking Dawn - Part 1, The Twilight Saga: Breaking Dawn - Part 2
4	Madea	34th, 37th, 38th, 40th	A Madea Christmas, Boo! A Madea Halloween, Boo 2! A Madea Halloween, A Madea Family Funeral
4	DC Extended Universe	37th, 41st, 44th	Batman v Superman: Dawn of Justice, Suicide Squad, Wonder Woman 1984, Shazam! Fury of the Gods
3	The Cannonball Run	2nd, 5th, 10th	The Cannonball Run, Cannonball Run II, Speed Zone
3	Rambo (franchise)	6th, 9th, 40th	Rambo: First Blood Part II, Rambo III, Rambo: Last Blood
3	Godzilla (franchise)	6th, 19th, 40th	Godzilla 1985, Godzilla (1998), Godzilla: King of the Monsters
3	James Bond	6th, 20th, 23rd	A View to a Kill, The World is Not Enough, Die Another Day
3	A Nightmare on Elm Street (franchise)	9th, 10th, 12th	A Nightmare on Elm Street 4: The Dream Master, A Nightmare on Elm Street 5: The Dream Child, Freddy's Dead: The Final Nightmare
3	Star Trek	10th, 15th, 46th	Star Trek V: The Final Frontier, Star Trek Generations, Star Trek: Section 31
3	The Exorcist (franchise)	11th, 25th, 44th	The Exorcist III, Exorcist: The Beginning, The Exorcist: Believer
3	The Pink Panther	15th, 27th, 30th	Son of the Pink Panther, The Pink Panther, The Pink Panther 2
3	Fantastic Four	26th, 28th, 36th	Fantastic Four (2005), Fantastic Four: Rise of the Silver Surfer, Fantastic Four (2015)
3	The Expendables (franchise)	31st, 35th, 44th	The Expendables, The Expendables 3, Expend4bles
3	Fifty Shades (film series)	36th, 38th, 39th	Fifty Shades of Grey, Fifty Shades Darker, Fifty Shades Freed
3	365 Days	41st, 43rd	365 Days, 365 Days: This Day, The Next 365 Days
3	Sony's Spider-Man Universe	43rd, 45th	Morbius, Madame Web, Kraven the Hunter

=== By person ===
The following people received at least 10 nominations overall:

Nominations	Title
39	Sylvester Stallone
37	Adam Sandler
21	Tyler Perry
17	Kevin Costner
16	Madonna
15	Eddie Murphy
14	Michael Bay
13	M. Night Shyamalan
12	Ben Affleck
12	Lorenzo di Bonaventura
12	Jennifer Lopez
11	Arnold Schwarzenegger
10	Jack Giarraputo

The following winners received at least 5 awards overall:

Awards	Title
12	Sylvester Stallone
9	Madonna
8	Adam Sandler
6	Kevin Costner
6	Bo Derek
6	Eddie Murphy
5	M. Night Shyamalan

== Ceremonies ==
- 1980: 1st Golden Raspberry Awards
- 1981: 2nd Golden Raspberry Awards
- 1982: 3rd Golden Raspberry Awards
- 1983: 4th Golden Raspberry Awards
- 1984: 5th Golden Raspberry Awards
- 1985: 6th Golden Raspberry Awards
- 1986: 7th Golden Raspberry Awards
- 1987: 8th Golden Raspberry Awards
- 1988: 9th Golden Raspberry Awards
- 1989: 10th Golden Raspberry Awards
- 1990: 11th Golden Raspberry Awards
- 1991: 12th Golden Raspberry Awards
- 1992: 13th Golden Raspberry Awards
- 1993: 14th Golden Raspberry Awards
- 1994: 15th Golden Raspberry Awards
- 1995: 16th Golden Raspberry Awards
- 1996: 17th Golden Raspberry Awards
- 1997: 18th Golden Raspberry Awards
- 1998: 19th Golden Raspberry Awards
- 1999: 20th Golden Raspberry Awards
- 2000: 21st Golden Raspberry Awards
- 2001: 22nd Golden Raspberry Awards
- 2002: 23rd Golden Raspberry Awards
- 2003: 24th Golden Raspberry Awards
- 2004: 25th Golden Raspberry Awards
- 2005: 26th Golden Raspberry Awards
- 2006: 27th Golden Raspberry Awards
- 2007: 28th Golden Raspberry Awards
- 2008: 29th Golden Raspberry Awards
- 2009: 30th Golden Raspberry Awards
- 2010: 31st Golden Raspberry Awards
- 2011: 32nd Golden Raspberry Awards
- 2012: 33rd Golden Raspberry Awards
- 2013: 34th Golden Raspberry Awards
- 2014: 35th Golden Raspberry Awards
- 2015: 36th Golden Raspberry Awards
- 2016: 37th Golden Raspberry Awards
- 2017: 38th Golden Raspberry Awards
- 2018: 39th Golden Raspberry Awards
- 2019: 40th Golden Raspberry Awards
- 2020: 41st Golden Raspberry Awards
- 2021: 42nd Golden Raspberry Awards
- 2022: 43rd Golden Raspberry Awards
- 2023: 44th Golden Raspberry Awards
- 2024: 45th Golden Raspberry Awards
- 2025: 46th Golden Raspberry Awards

== Reception ==
The Razzies have received criticism, including from news sources such as IndieWire and The Daily Telegraph, for several issues, including that members of the Golden Raspberry Foundation are not required to watch the nominated films. (The Razzies follow a different set of rules than the invitation-only Academy of Motion Picture Arts and Sciences does, although Academy Award voters have also admitted to not watching all nominated films.) Critics take issue with the Razzies picking "easy targets" and critically panned mainstream films instead of those perceived as less popular but more deserving of notice, and continuing to appeal to celebrities, seemingly for publicity and attention.

Sam Adams of IndieWire has said the Razzies are "like hecklers hurling insults at comedians or a concertgoer yelling out 'Whoo!' during a quiet song, they're not-so-secretly crying out to be noticed. The Razzies, properly enough, avoid pouncing on the little guy; they don't trash no-budget indies no one has seen for having bad lighting or terrible sound. But it’s hard to escape the notion that it’s less a matter of principle than because they wouldn’t know Joe Swanberg from a hole in the wall." Robbie Collin of The Daily Telegraph wrote, however, that "the Razzies' ongoing failure to train its sights on anything but the most obvious targets means it grows more tired and redundant by the year". CraveOnline's William Bibbiani stated that the Razzies follow "a cheap shot of pranksterism", and "with only a handful of exceptions, the Razzies have only seen fit to nominate the most infamous movies of the year, and not necessarily the worst."

In 2021, Liam Gaughan of the Dallas Observer wrote, "It’s easy to find fault in any awards nominations, be it Oscars or Razzies, but the greater issue that the Razzies face is that making fun of bad movies is no longer original. Film criticism, essays and satire all live in abundance on the internet, from both established publications and non-professionals." Daniel Cook Johnson of MovieWeb echoed a similar sentiment, writing, "Wilson and Murphy's insulting event may have been a wonderfully snarky and skewering enterprise back in the '80s when there was much less film criticism and audience reactions to recent movies. But now, there's little reason for such an invalid vehicle, and the retirement option should be recognized before their relevance and shaky reputation are completely gone."

The Razzies have also seen significant criticism from both within the industry and its own voting body for including underage actors and actresses in their ballots and nominations, with many noting the outcome of their careers and later personal and legal issues. Among those who were nominated or won include Aileen Quinn (at age 11) for Annie (winner), Gary Coleman (at age 14) for On the Right Track in 1982, Macaulay Culkin (at age 14) for Getting Even with Dad, The Pagemaster, and Richie Rich in 1995, Jake Lloyd (at age 11) for Star Wars: Episode I – The Phantom Menace, Jaden Smith (age 15) for After Earth (winner), and Ryan Kiera Armstrong (at age 12) for Firestarter. Maddie Ziegler, though 18 years old when nominated, won Worst Supporting Actress for Music, released in 2021, for a role she played at 14 years old during filming in 2017. After backlash in 2023, the Razzies announced they would no longer nominate individuals under age 18.

== See also ==
- Academy Awards
- Stinkers Bad Movie Awards
- The Golden Turkey Awards
- Golden Kela Awards
- List of people who have accepted Golden Raspberry Awards
