= Battlefield Earth (film) =

2000 film by Roger Christian

- Theatrical release poster
- Directed by: Roger Christian
- Screenplay by: Corey Mandell; J. D. Shapiro
- Based on: Battlefield Earth by L. Ron Hubbard
- Produced by: Jonathan Krane; Elie Samaha; John Travolta
- Starring: John Travolta; Barry Pepper; Forest Whitaker; Kim Coates; Richard Tyson; Sabine Karsenti
- Cinematography: Giles Nuttgens
- Edited by: Robin Russelle
- Music by: Elia Cmiral
- Production companies: Franchise Pictures; JTP Films
- Distributed by: Morgan Creek Productions (through Warner Bros.)
- Release dates: May 10, 2000 (Grauman's Chinese Theatre); May 12, 2000 (United States)
- Running time: 117 minutes
- Country: United States
- Language: English
- Budget: $44 million
- Box office: $29.7 million

Battlefield Earth is a 2000 American science fiction action film directed by Roger Christian from a script by Corey Mandell and J. David Shapiro. Based on the 1982 novel by Scientology founder L. Ron Hubbard, Battlefield Earth is set in the year 3000 and follows a human rebellion against the "Psychlos", a tyrannical alien species that has ruled Earth for a thousand years. John Travolta, who produced the film, stars as main antagonist Terl alongside Barry Pepper and Forest Whitaker.

Before his death in 1986, Hubbard himself had campaigned for a Hollywood adaptation of his novel since its publication, asking support from Scientology figures in the industry, including Travolta. After the financial and critical success of 1994's Pulp Fiction revitalized Travolta's career, he decided to use his newfound influence to revive and lead the project with the involvement of other Scientologist figures, although funding from major studios proved troublesome to obtain due to concerns regarding the script and Hubbard's connections to Scientology.

In 1998, it was picked up by the independent production company Franchise Pictures, which specialized in rescuing pet projects. Production began in 1999, largely funded by the German distribution company Intertainment AG [de], and with Travolta personally contributing millions of dollars; he envisioned the film as the first in a duology, as it only adapts the first half of the novel.

Battlefield Earth premiered at Grauman's Chinese Theatre in Hollywood, Los Angeles, on May 10, 2000, followed by a wide release on May 12 by Warner Bros. and Morgan Creek Productions. The film received overwhelmingly negative reviews from critics, who criticized virtually every aspect of the film, including its writing, disjointedness, acting, pacing, lack of action, and visuals. It was also a box-office bomb, grossing $29.7 million worldwide against a $44 million budget.

Met with widespread derision from both audiences and mainstream media, Travolta stayed away from the film after its opening weekend. It was immediately labelled, and remains regarded as, one of the worst films ever made and the worst-received film in Travolta's career alongside Staying Alive (1983), ridiculed for its dialogue, performances, Psychlo makeup, and overuse of Dutch angles. (Note: Attributed to multiple references:) It earned eighteen awards from different sources, all pejorative, including a then-record of eight wins at the Golden Raspberry Awards, which later named it "Worst Picture of the Decade" in 2010.

In 2004, Franchise Pictures was sued by its investors and went bankrupt after it emerged that it had fraudulently overstated the film's budget by $31 million. This, coupled with the film's poor reception, ended Travolta's plans for a sequel that would have adapted the second half of the novel.

== Plot ==
In 3000 AD, Jonnie Goodboy Tyler lives in the Rocky Mountains with a band of cave-dwellers who fear the "demons" that rule Earth. Jonnie doubts their stories and rides into the lowlands, where hunters Carlo and Rock show him a desolate and overgrown city. While exploring it, he and Carlo are captured by the demons, a cruel alien race called Psychlos, and taken as slaves to a base in the ruins of Denver. The base is covered with an enormous dome that provides the Psychlos with a breathable atmosphere. Jonnie shows resourcefulness, drawing the respect of the other human slaves and the interest of Terl, the high-born Earth security chief.

Terl learns from a visiting supervisor that his temporary assignment on Earth will be extended indefinitely as punishment for offending a politician. Desperate to leave, he hatches a plan with his assistant Ker. They know about a recently exposed gold deposit in an area with elevated radiation levels. Gold is valuable to the Psychlos, who have been reporting losses from their mining operations, but radiation causes their air mixture to explode. Terl and Ker will train humans to mine the gold, and Terl will use part of it to bribe his way off the planet.

Terl places Jonnie in a learning machine that rapidly teaches him Psychlo language and technology. Jonnie shares his knowledge with other slaves while hiding it from Terl and Ker. After Jonnie stages an unsuccessful escape attempt, Terl takes him to the Denver Library hoping to impress him that human knowledge is no match for the Psychlos. Jonnie reads the Declaration of Independence and is inspired to seek not only escape but reconquest. Jonnie's fiancée Chrissy is captured while searching for him and fitted with an explosive collar. Terl tells Jonnie that she will be killed if he does not obey, also making an example out of a fellow slave, Sammy.

Believing that the slaves are subdued, Terl blackmails the planet administrator into letting him order the gold mining operation. Jonnie receives further training to pilot aircraft and is sent to the mining site with a team. He leaves half of them to pretend to work while the other half gather abandoned human weapons and take gold from Fort Knox to pass off as mining production. Ker tries to blackmail Terl for a greater share of the gold at Jonnie's urging, but Terl detects the attempt and shoots off Ker's hand.

The humans launch their revolt, assaulting the base while using Harrier jets to combat the Psychlo air defenses and explosives to rupture the dome. Terl orders the execution of all humans and alerts the Psychlo homeworld to teleport an extermination force. As the teleporter activates, Jonnie fights with Terl, reattaching Chrissy's collar to his arm and tricking him into detonating it. Sammy's brother Mickey rides the teleporter to the homeworld with a nuclear weapon. The fallout from the weapon incinerates the atmosphere, causing the entire planet to explode.

At Fort Knox, Jonnie gloats at a captive Terl, telling him that surviving Psychlos will pay any price for him after they learn that his scheme led to their defeat. Ker agrees to teach Psychlo technology to the humans and gloats along with them.

== Cast ==
- John Travolta as Terl
- Barry Pepper as Jonnie Goodboy Tyler
- Forest Whitaker as Ker
- Kim Coates as Carlo
- Sabine Karsenti as Chrissy
- Richard Tyson as Robert the Fox
- Kelly Preston as Chirk
- Marie-Josée Croze as Mara
- Michael MacRae as District Manager Zete
- Shaun Austin-Olsen as Planetship Numph
- Tim Post as the Assistant Planetship
- Michael Byrne as Parson staffer
- Christian Tessier as Mickey
- Sylvain Landry as Sammy
- Earl Pastko as the Bartender
- Noël Burton as the Clinko Learning instructor

== Production ==
=== Initial deals ===
==== 1982–1986: Hubbard period ====
After Battlefield Earth was published in 1982, L. Ron Hubbard suggested that a film version of the book was in the works. He gave an interview in February 1983 to the Rocky Mountain News in which he told the reporter, "I've recently written three screenplays, and some interest has been expressed in Battlefield Earth, so I suppose I'll be right back in Hollywood one of these days and probably on location in the Denver area for Battlefield Earth when they film it."

Hubbard's comments suggest that he saw himself being involved in the film's production; author Stewart Lamont suggests that Hubbard may have envisioned directing it, having previously helmed Scientology training films. In October 1983, the film rights were sold by the Church of Scientology's literary agency, Author Services Inc., to Salem Productions of Los Angeles. Two films were envisaged, each covering half of the book and tentatively budgeted at $15 million each. William Immerman was set as the producer for the film. Veteran screenwriter Abraham Polonsky and British director Ken Annakin were hired to produce a film breakdown, with production scheduled to begin in 1985. In November 1984, Santa Monica public relations firm Dateline Communications announced a nationwide contest to promote the film. First- and second-place prizes were an all-expense-paid trip to the film's production location and a paid walk-on part in the film, and other announced prizes included a trip to Los Angeles for the world premiere, records, cassettes, and hardcover and paperback copies of the novel. A 30-foot (10 m) high inflatable figure of the film's villain, Terl, was erected by Scientology officials on Hollywood Boulevard in 1984 in an effort to promote the production, and auditions were held in Denver. The project collapsed, and Hubbard died soon afterward, in 1986.

==== 1990s: Travolta's development ====
John Travolta had converted to Scientology in 1975 and became one of the Church of Scientology's most prominent supporters. Hubbard sent him an autographed copy of Battlefield Earth when the book was first published in 1982; he reportedly hoped that Travolta would turn the book into a film "in the vein of Star Wars and Close Encounters of the Third Kind". While Travolta was interested, his influence in Hollywood at the time was low after participating in a series of flops. He gained renewed influence with the success of the 1994 film Pulp Fiction, which garnered Travolta an Academy Award nomination for Best Actor. He took on the task of making Battlefield Earth into a movie. Travolta described the book in interviews as "like Pulp Fiction for the year 3000" and "like Star Wars, only better". He lobbied influential figures in Hollywood to fund the project and was reported to have recruited the aid of fellow Scientologists in promoting it. Bill Mechanic, the former head of 20th Century Fox, said that "John wanted me to make Battlefield Earth. He had Scientologists all over me. They come up to you and they know who you are. And they go, 'We're really excited about Battlefield Earth.' ... Do you think in any way, shape, or form that weirding me out is going to make me want to make this movie?"

I have a special affection for this book. Hubbard was a great writer, and I had an idea of the movie's potential, a fantasy in my mind that lasted for years.

— John Travolta

Travolta's involvement in Battlefield Earth was first publicized in late 1995. He told the New York Daily News that "Battlefield Earth is the pinnacle of using my power for something. I told my manager, 'If we can't do the things now that we want to do, what good is the power? Let's test it and try to get the things done that we believe in.'" It was assumed from the start that Travolta would star in and produce the film, which would be distributed by Metro-Goldwyn-Mayer (MGM); J. D. Shapiro was to write the screenplay. Shapiro was eventually fired because he refused to accept some suggestions from the studio producers that changed the tone of his script, including removing key scenes and characters. In 1997, Travolta's long-time manager, Jonathan Krane, signed a two-year deal with 20th Century Fox, under which the studio would release Battlefield Earth instead of MGM, but the deal with Fox fell through. James Robert Parish, author of Fiasco: A History of Hollywood's Iconic Flops, comments that both MGM and Fox regarded the project as too risky on several grounds: its heavy reliance on special effects would be very expensive, pushing the budget up to as much as $100 million, Hubbard's narrative was seen as naive and outdated, and the "Scientology factor" could work against the film, negating Travolta's star power. As one studio executive put it, "On any film there are ten variables that can kill you. On this film there was an eleventh: Scientology. It just wasn't something anyone really wanted to get involved with."

=== Franchise Pictures ===
In 1998, the project was taken over by Franchise Pictures, a recently established independent movie studio. Its head, Elie Samaha, a dry cleaning mogul turned nightclub owner, specialized in rescuing stars' pet projects. Franchise sought out stars whose projects were stalled at the major studios, bringing them aboard at reduced salaries. Samaha's approach made waves in Hollywood, earning him a reputation of being able to produce star vehicles more cheaply than larger studios. His unorthodox deals raised eyebrows and the entertainment industry magazine Variety commented that they were "often so complex and variable as to leave outsiders scratching their heads". As Samaha put it, "I said, 'If John wants to make this movie, what does he want to get paid?' ... Because I do not pay anybody what they make. That is not my business plan." He learned of Battlefield Earth from Cassian Elwes, an agent at the theatrical agency William Morris, and approached Travolta. A deal was soon struck and financing was arranged; Travolta significantly reduced his normal fee of $20 million, lowering the film's cost from the $100 million that had been forecast, and costs were reduced further by using Canadian locations and facilities.

The film was set up as an independent production for Morgan Creek Productions which would release the film through Warner Bros. Pictures in the United States and select international territories under a distribution agreement. Travolta's company JTP Films was involved, and Travolta invested $5 million of his own money in the production. Warner Bros. allocated $20 million for the film's marketing and distribution. Franchise Pictures retained the foreign rights, licensing the European distribution rights to the German group Intertainment AG [de] in exchange for 47% of the production costs, set at $75 million. The Intertainment deal later became the focus of a legal action that bankrupted Franchise. Samaha forecast that the film would be a hit: "My projected numbers on Battlefield Earth are really conservative. I'm already covered internationally, and there's no way I'm going to lose if the movie does $35 million domestically. And Travolta has never had an action movie do under $35 million."

[Battlefield Earth] is going to make people in Hollywood take notice of Elie Samaha. I'm not going to be the laughing stock any more.

— Elie Samaha

According to Samaha, he got around the "negative factor" of the Scientology connection by the simple expedient of "yell at everyone, 'This is a science-fiction film starring John Travolta!' again and again". Samaha acknowledged that "everyone thought I was crazy or mentally retarded" for taking on the project, but pitched the film as "Planet of the Apes starring John Travolta". Others in Hollywood were skeptical; an unnamed producer was quoted by the Los Angeles Daily News as saying that "Battlefield Earth has the stench of death. It should never have been made. It's an $80 million vanity project for Travolta." Travolta's theatrical agency William Morris was also reportedly unenthusiastic, leading to Travolta threatening to leave them if they did not help him to set up the film. Fellow Scientologist Tom Cruise was said to have warned Warner Bros. that he thought the movie was a bad idea. Cruise's spokesperson denied this.

=== Author Services Inc. and Church of Scientology ===
In 1999, Author Services Inc., which controls Hubbard's copyrights, said that it was "donating its share of the profits from the film to charitable organizations that direct drug education and drug rehabilitation programs around the world". It was reported that the merchandising revenues would be passed on to the Scientology-linked groups Narconon, a drug rehabilitation program, and Applied Scholastics, which promotes Hubbard's study tech. Movie-related sales of the book would fund the marketing of Hubbard's fiction books and the L. Ron Hubbard Writers of the Future contest. The size of the revenue deal was not disclosed; Trendmasters, the makers of Battlefield Earth toys, said that its deal was strictly with Franchise Pictures, which declined to comment, and Warner Bros. said that its role was limited to distribution and had nothing to do with the associated merchandising deals.

In February 2000, Church of Scientology spokesman Mike Rinder told Tribune Media Services that any spinoff deals based on Hubbard's novel would benefit Author Services Inc.; another Church spokesman, Aron Mason, said, "The church has no financial interest in Battlefield Earth. Author Services is not part of the Church of Scientology. They are a literary agency without any connection to the church."

Travolta's manager Jonathan Krane denied that the Church of Scientology was playing any part in the production: "I've never even dealt with or talked to the church on this. This is an action-adventure, science-fiction story. Period. The movie has nothing to do with Scientology." Krane said that the film had been financed "without a dollar coming from the Scientologists". Some people in Hollywood feared that Travolta was using his box office draw to promote Scientology teachings, and one film producer said, "This film could encourage kids to embrace the whole strange world of Scientology." Travolta said, "I'm doing it because it's a great piece of science fiction. This is not about Hubbard. I'm very interested in Scientology, but that's personal. This is different." In a separate interview Travolta commented on the perceived similarities between Battlefield Earth and Scientology: "Well, they are kind of synonymous ... L. Ron Hubbard is very famous for Scientology and Dianetics. On the other hand, he's equally as famous in the science fiction world. So for people to think that ... look, I don't want everybody to try Scientology. I don't really care if somebody thinks that. I'm not worried about it. You can't be. The truth of why I'm doing it is because it's a great piece of science fiction. I'm going to be the wickedest 9-foot alien you've ever seen in your life."

=== Pre-production ===
Travolta and his manager, Jonathan Krane, took the lead in hiring the on-set personnel. They initially approached Quentin Tarantino to direct the film. When Tarantino declined, Roger Christian, a protégé of George Lucas, was recruited as the director, on the advice of Lucas. Christian had most recently been the second unit director on Lucas' Star Wars: Episode I – The Phantom Menace. Patrick Tatopoulos was signed to develop the production design and costumes, including the design of the alien Psychlos, and Czech composer Elia Cmiral was signed to provide the film's score. Travolta and Krane also signed cinematographer Giles Nuttgens and most of the principal actors. Corey Mandell signed on to write the script for the film, which had gone through 10 revisions. Mandell said in an interview, "I am not a Scientologist ... I came on board because John asked me to read the book and said, 'It's not a religious book. It's a science-fiction story. There's nothing sacred about the story, nothing of the religious philosophy.' I was given this to read purely as science fiction – to see whether it was intriguing as a movie. And it was." Mandell's agents and managers warned him on taking on the project.

=== Filming ===
From left to right, Barry Pepper, John Travolta, and Forest Whitaker

Filmed in Canada, principal photography took place in Montreal, Saint-Jean-sur-Richelieu, and other Quebec locations during the summer and autumn of 1999. In parallel, second unit shooting took place in Jeju Island, South Korea. In January 1999, Travolta flew his private Boeing 707 on a secret visit to Montreal to scout out locations for shooting. The film was reported to have been the most expensive production shot in Canada up to that point. It was also reported that the production costs would have been twice as high had the film been shot in the United States. Almost every shot in the film is at a Dutch angle, because, according to Roger Christian, he wanted the film to look like a comic book.

Travolta's wife Kelly Preston also appeared in one scene, playing Terl's "baldish Psychlo girlfriend" Chirk. Travolta originally saw himself in the role of Jonnie, but by the time the movie was actually made, Travolta felt he was too old to play the heroic role and took the role of the main villain instead. Travolta's role in the film required what he described as an amazing physical transformation: "I wear a tall head apparatus with strange hair. I have amber eyes and talons for hands. It's quite remarkable ... I'm on 4-foot stilts." To star in the film, Travolta turned down the movie The Shipping News and postponed production on Standing Room Only.

The film was "plagued by bad buzz" before release with the media speculating about the possible influence of Scientology and commenting on the production's tight security. As the film was entering post-production, the alternative newspaper Mean Magazine obtained a copy of the screenplay. Mean's staffers changed the script's title to "Dark Forces", re-attributed it to "Desmond Finch", and gave it to readers at major Hollywood film production companies. The comments that came back were unfavorable: "a thoroughly silly plotline is made all the more ludicrous by its hamfisted dialog and ridiculously shallow characterizations"; "a completely predictable story that just isn't written well enough to make up for its lack of originality"; "as entertaining as watching a fly breathe".

== Release ==
Battlefield Earth was released by Warner Bros. Pictures on May 12, 2000, three days after the 50th anniversary of the publication of Hubbard's book Dianetics: The Modern Science of Mental Health, a date celebrated by Scientologists worldwide as a major Scientology holiday. Its premiere was held on May 10, 2000, at Grauman's Chinese Theatre on Hollywood Boulevard in Los Angeles.

=== Merchandising ===
A limited range of merchandising was produced for the film, including posters, a soundtrack CD by Elia Cmíral, recorded by the Seattle Symphony, and a re-released version of the novel. Trendmasters also produced a range of action figures of the main characters, including an 11-inch (280 mm) figure of Travolta as Terl voicing lines from the film.

=== Home media ===
A special edition DVD was released by Warner Home Video in 2001, deleting one scene and including two additional scenes, which added two minutes to the film's running time. The DVD includes commentary tracks with director Roger Christian and production, costume and creature designer Patrick Tatopoulos, as well as special features including John Travolta's alien makeup test. Jeff Berkwits of Sci Fi Weekly wrote that "the Battlefield Earth Special Edition DVD is packed with information, offering an enlightening glimpse into the creative process behind this imperfect but entertaining picture". Randy Salas of the Star Tribune described it as the "best DVD for a bad movie." A review of the DVD release in the Los Angeles Times was more critical: "A dated visual style, patched-together special effects and ludicrous dialogue combine in a film that is a wholly miserable experience."

In November 2012, the film was first released on Blu-ray by Concorde Video in Germany, with the same Special Edition runtime as the original 2001 DVD release. However, the film was scanned at a 1.78:1 aspect ratio instead of the original 2.39:1 scope.

The original theatrical version was released on Blu-ray by Mill Creek Entertainment on September 15, 2020, for the 20th anniversary of the release.

== Reception ==
=== Box office ===
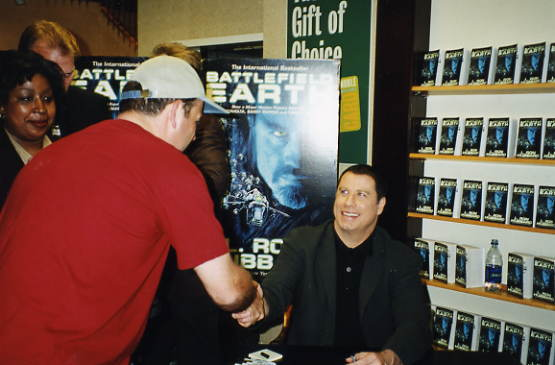
John Travolta signing copies of Battlefield Earth during a promotional tour in 2000

The film's scathing reviews and poor word-of-mouth led to a precipitous falling-off in its grosses. Having earned $11.5 million from 3,307 screens on its opening weekend, it ranked in second place at the box office below Gladiator. Its take collapsed by 66 percent to $3.9 million the following weekend, giving an average take of $1,158 per screen. The film made almost 54 percent of its entire domestic gross in its first three days and flatlined thereafter, with earnings dropping a further 74 percent by the end of its third week to $1 million. The following week, facing earnings of just $205,000, Warner Bros. attempted to cut its losses by slashing the number of screens at which the film was being shown. The number was reduced from 2,600 to 600. By its sixth weekend on release, the film was showing on 95 screens and had made $19,000 in a week – less than $200 per screen.

The film ultimately earned $21,471,685 in the United States and Canada and $8,253,978 internationally for a total of $29,725,663 worldwide, falling well short of its reported $73 million production budget and $20 million in estimated marketing costs. It is one of the most expensive box-office bombs in film history.

In a 2006 list of "the top 10 biggest box office failures", Kat Giantis of MSN Movies placed Battlefield Earth as tied with Inchon (both of which are sponsored by their respective religious movements: Scientology and the Unification Church) for number seven. In a 2023 list of "the 50 worst decisions in movie history", Andy Greene of Rolling Stone included it at number eleven.

=== Critical response ===
Entertainment Weekly spoof poster for Battlefield Earth quoting the film's many negative reviews

Battlefield Earth is like taking a bus trip with someone who has needed a bath for a long time. It's not merely bad; it's unpleasant in a hostile way ... I watched it in mounting gloom, realizing I was witnessing something historic, a film that for decades to come will be the punch line of jokes about bad movies.

— Roger Ebert

Upon release, Battlefield Earth was near-universally panned by critics. On the review aggregator website Rotten Tomatoes, 3% of 147 critics' reviews are positive. The website's consensus reads: "Ugly, campy, and poorly acted, Battlefield Earth is a stunningly misguided, aggressively bad sci-fi folly." Metacritic, which uses a weighted average, assigned the film a score of 9 out of 100, based on 33 critics, indicating "overwhelming dislike". Audiences polled by CinemaScore gave the film an average grade of "D+" on an A+ to F scale.

The film was greeted with widespread derision in preview screenings. An audience of Los Angeles entertainment journalists, critics, and others greeted the film with guffaws and hoots at a screening in Century City while other viewers in Washington, D.C., and Baltimore responded with derisive laughter or simply walked out. At a post-launch publicity event, Travolta, on asking assembled journalists if they had enjoyed it, received no reply. He later asserted that other filmmakers had enjoyed the film: "When I felt better about everything was when George Lucas and Quentin Tarantino, and a lot of people that I felt knew what they were doing, saw it and thought it was a great piece of science fiction." Christian also spoke of an initially positive reception, mentioning an enthusiastic response from both the audience and Tarantino.

Leonard Maltin rated the film a "BOMB" in his book Leonard Maltin's Movie Guide, writing: "Clumsy plot, misplaced satire, unbelievable coincidences, and a leaden pace trample Travolta's weird but amusing performance." David Bleiler gave the film one star out of four in the TLA Video & DVD Guide, writing: "This is disjointed, tedious, and every bit as bad as its reputation." Jon Stewart mocked the film on his television program The Daily Show, describing it as "a cross between Star Wars and the smell of ass".

Rita Kempley of The Washington Post wrote: "A million monkeys with a million crayons would be hard-pressed in a million years to create anything as cretinous as Battlefield Earth. This film version of L. Ron Hubbard's futuristic novel is so breathtakingly awful in concept and execution, it wouldn't tax the smarts of a troglodyte." Dennis Harvey of Variety described the film as "pretty much the Showgirls of sci-fi shoot-'em-ups." Elvis Mitchell of The New York Times wrote: "It may be a bit early to make such judgments, but Battlefield Earth may well turn out to be the worst movie of this century" and called it "Plan 9 from Outer Space for a new generation." The English film critic Jonathan Ross said: "Everything about Battlefield Earth sucks. Everything. The over-the-top music, the unbelievable sets, the terrible dialogue, the hammy acting, the lousy special effects, the beginning, the middle and especially the end." The Hollywood Reporter summarized the film as being "a flat-out mess, by golly, with massive narrative sinkholes, leading to moments of outstanding disbelief in the muddled writing and shockingly chaotic mise en scène that's accompanied by ear-pummeling sound and bombastic music."

Critics noted the film's heavy use of tilted camera angles and luridly tinted scenes.

Many critics singled out the excessive use of angled camera shots. "The director, Roger Christian, has learned from better films that directors sometimes tilt their cameras", wrote Roger Ebert, "but he has not learned why". Derivative special effects and illogical plotting were also widely criticized. The Providence Journal highlighted the film's unusual color scheme: "Battlefield Earth's primary colors are blue and gray, adding to the misery. Whenever we glimpse sunlight, the screen goes all stale yellow, as though someone had urinated on the print. This, by the way, is not such a bad idea."

The reviews were not uniformly negative. Bob Graham of the San Francisco Chronicle wrote that the film "effectively presented" the "wary, uncomprehending relationship" between the humans and the Psychlos. A review at JoBlo's Movie Reviews was also positive; Berge Garabedian wrote, "Despite starting off like a bad Star Trek episode, this film eventually graduates to a higher level with great special effects, some really slick bad-ass aliens, an intriguing premise, and a good flow of loud, campy fun." Luke Thompson of New Times LA wrote: "Think Independence Day without the ponderous build-up or self-importance. Imagine how much more enjoyable the other blockbuster-of-the-moment, Gladiator, might have been if Joaquin Phoenix had addressed every one of his rivals as 'Rat brain.'" Sean Axmaker of the Seattle Post-Intelligencer wrote positively of the interaction between Travolta and Whitaker in the film, comparing them to Abbott and Costello. Axmaker wrote that they provide "much-needed comic relief in an otherwise humorless paean to freedom". Axmaker also wrote positively of the production design used in the film, commenting that the director had created "a world of crumbling dead cities and empty malls turned into human hunting grounds". Hap Erstein of The Palm Beach Post commented: "production designer Patrick Tatopoulos contributes some good work, imagining the ruins of Denver and Washington, D.C., with echoes of Planet of the Apes."

=== Filmmakers' response ===
J.D. Shapiro, who wrote the original screenplay, was critical of the film. In a 2010 letter to The New York Post, he asserted that his draft bore little resemblance to the final script; the result, he said, was embarrassing: "The only time I saw the movie was at the premiere, which was one too many times."

Responding to the criticism, one of the film's producers, Elie Samaha, complained: "[The] critics were waiting for us to ... chop our heads off. Everybody hated Scientology for some reason. I didn't know people were so prejudiced." Ebert noted that the film "contains no evidence of Scientology, or any other system of thought."

=== Accolades ===
In this inept futuristic epic adapted from the novel by sci-fi author and Scientology founder L. Ron Hubbard, a greedy security chief (the ridiculous-looking John Travolta) enslaves prisoners to mine gold for him. When it was released, Battlefield Earth became an instant camp classic – think Showgirls in outer space. The New York Times said, "Battlefield Earth is the worst movie of this century. Sitting through it is like watching the most expensively mounted high school play of all time. It is beyond conventional criticism and belongs in the elect pantheon that includes such delights as Showgirls and Revolution: the Moe Howard School of Melodrama."

— The Stinkers

Battlefield Earth frequently appears on worst film lists, and is included on Rotten Tomatoes' "100 Worst of the Worst Movies" list. Rotten Tomatoes ranked the film 27th in the 100 worst reviewed films of the first decade of the 21st century. The Arizona Republic listed it as the worst film of 2000, and called it a "monumentally bad sci-fi flick". In 2003, Richard Roeper placed the film on his alphabetized list of his forty least favorite films of all time, writing, "The real danger of Scientology is that John Travolta may someday make another movie based on the writings of L. Ron Hubbard." In 2001 the film received the "Worst Picture" award from the Dallas-Fort Worth Film Critics Association. James Franklin of McClatchy-Tribune News Service put the film as the worst of his "summer blockbuster bombs" list, giving it a rating of four stars for "traumatic" on his scale of how the films "generate a perverse sense of nostalgia". Christopher Null of Filmcritic.com listed the film's villain Terl at number 8 of his "10 Least Effective Movie Villains", writing: "we still can't imagine how anyone would go face to face with one of these creatures and react with anything other than simple laughter."

Battlefield Earth swept the 2000 Golden Raspberry Awards and received seven Razzies, including Worst Picture, Worst Actor (Travolta), Worst Supporting Actor (Pepper), Worst Supporting Actress (Preston), Worst Director (Christian), Worst Screenplay (Mandell and Shapiro) and Worst Screen Couple (Travolta and anyone sharing the screen with him). This tied for the highest number of Razzies won by a single film at that time, with Showgirls achieving seven wins in 1995. Battlefield Earth was later awarded an eighth Razzie for "Worst Drama of Our First 25 Years". In 2010, the film received an award for "Worst Picture of the Decade", bringing its total number of Razzie Awards to nine and consequently setting a record for the most Razzies won by a single film. That record was surpassed in 2012 when Jack and Jill won ten awards.

As Travolta did not attend to collect his trophies, an action figure of Terl, his character, accepted them in his place. Travolta responded a week later to the awards: "I didn't even know there were such awards. I have people around me whose job it is to not tell me about such things. They're obviously doing their job. Not every film can be a critical and box office success. It would have been awful only if Battlefield Earth was neither. That's not the case. It is edging toward the $100m mark which means it has found an audience even if it didn't impress critics. I'd rather my films connect with audiences than with critics because it gives you more longevity as a performer." He later insisted that he still felt "really good about it. Here I was taking big chances, breaking a new genre."

Pepper said that he regretted not having been invited to the Razzies and blamed the film's failure on "a weak script and poor production values". Writer J. D. Shapiro received his Worst Screenplay award from Razzies founder John J. B. Wilson during a radio program; he said that Travolta had called the script "the Schindler's List of science fiction". Shapiro made an appearance to pick up the Worst Picture of the Decade award at the 30th Golden Raspberry Awards, giving a speech quoting negative reviews, and thanking both the studio for firing him and Corey Mandell for "rewriting my script in a way I never, ever, ever — could have imagined or conceived of myself."

The film's producer, Elie Samaha, said that he welcomed the "free publicity", as "the more the critics [bash] Battlefield Earth, the more DVDs it sells. It is the kind of film that makes a movie legend and we feel we have enough staying power to last long after the critics have quieted down."

At the Stinkers Bad Movie Awards, the film received individual nominations in nine categories, including Worst Picture, winning all but Worst Supporting Actor. The Stinkers later unveiled their "100 Years, 100 Stinkers" list in which people voted for the 100 worst films of the 20th century. Battlefield Earth not only made the final ballot; it took home the top prize for Worst Film of the Century.

Date	Award	Category	Recipients	Result	Ref.
2001	Stinkers Bad Movie Awards	Worst Picture	Battlefield Earth (Warner Bros.)	Won	
2001	Stinkers Bad Movie Awards	Worst Director	Roger Christian	Won	
2001	Stinkers Bad Movie Awards	Worst Actor	John Travolta	Won	
2001	Stinkers Bad Movie Awards	Worst Supporting Actor	Barry Pepper	Nominated	
2001	Stinkers Bad Movie Awards	Worst On-Screen Couple	John Travolta and anyone in the entire galaxy!	Won	
2001	Stinkers Bad Movie Awards	Worst On-Screen Group	The Psychlos and the Man-Animals	Won	
2001	Stinkers Bad Movie Awards	Most Unintentionally Funny Movie	Battlefield Earth (Warner Bros.)	Won	
2001	Stinkers Bad Movie Awards	Least "Special" Special Effects	Battlefield Earth (Warner Bros.)	Won	
2001	Stinkers Bad Movie Awards	Worst On-Screen Hairstyle	John Travolta and Forest Whitaker	Won	
January 6, 2001	Dallas–Fort Worth Film Critics Association	Worst Film	Battlefield Earth (Warner Bros.)	Won	
March 24, 2001	Golden Raspberry Awards	Worst Picture	Battlefield Earth (Warner Bros.)	Won	
March 24, 2001	Golden Raspberry Awards	Worst Actor	John Travolta	Won	
March 24, 2001	Golden Raspberry Awards	Worst Supporting Actor	Barry Pepper	Won	
March 24, 2001	Golden Raspberry Awards	Worst Supporting Actor	Forest Whitaker	Nominated	
March 24, 2001	Golden Raspberry Awards	Worst Supporting Actress	Kelly Preston	Won	
March 24, 2001	Golden Raspberry Awards	Worst Screen Couple	John Travolta and anyone sharing the screen with him	Won	
March 24, 2001	Golden Raspberry Awards	Worst Director	Roger Christian	Won	
March 24, 2001	Golden Raspberry Awards	Worst Screenplay	Corey Mandell and J. David Shapiro, based on the novel by L. Ron Hubbard	Won	
February 26, 2005	Golden Raspberry Awards	Worst "Drama" of Our First 25 Years	Battlefield Earth (Warner Bros.)	Won	
March 6, 2010	Golden Raspberry Awards	Worst Actor of the Decade	John Travolta	Nominated	
March 6, 2010	Golden Raspberry Awards	Worst Picture of the Decade	Battlefield Earth (Warner Bros.)	Won	

=== Allegations of Scientology influence ===
Stacy Brooks, then-president of the Lisa McPherson Trust, said: "There's no way that this movie would be happening without Scientology's backing ... This is one example of how Scientology insinuates itself in various aspects of the culture." Mark Bunker characterized the film as a recruitment tactic for the Church of Scientology, stating, "It's designed to introduce L. Ron Hubbard to a whole new generation of kids. It's there to plant a favorable seed in children's minds." Bunker criticized the promotional methods of the film—instead of granting interviews about the film to the press, John Travolta went on a book tour and signed copies of L. Ron Hubbard's novel. Bunker said, "When Michael Caine goes around to promote The Cider House Rules, he doesn't tour bookstores and sign copies of John Irving's novel ... Through the movie tie-in with the book, kids will send in the card to get their free poster, and eventually be introduced to Dianetics." Scientologist Nancy O'Meara, at the time treasurer of the Foundation for Religious Freedom and currently treasurer of the Scientology-run New Cult Awareness Network, responded to Bunker's statement: "Gimme a break ... That's like saying people are going to go see Gladiator and then suddenly find themselves wanting to explore Christianity."

Before the film was released, rumors and allegations began to circulate that Battlefield Earth contained subliminal messages promoting Scientology. (Note: Attributed to multiple references:) Former Scientologist Lawrence Wollersheim, in a press release issued by his group FACTNet, said that the Church of Scientology "has placed highly advanced subliminal messages in the Battlefield Earth film master to surreptitiously recruit new members from the movie audience and to get the audience to develop a revulsion for psychiatry and current mental health organizations and practices". Warner Bros. dismissed the claims as "silly nonsense", the Church of Scientology denounced them as "hogwash" and the media reacted with skepticism; as the Scottish journalist Duncan Campbell put it, "the only subliminal voice I could detect came about 10 minutes into this 121-minute film and it seemed to be saying Leeeaaave thisssss cinemmmaaa nooow". When asked about the similarities between the film and Scientology beliefs in intergalactic travel and aliens, church spokesman Aron Mason said, "That's a pretty crude parallel ... You'd have to make some serious leaps of logic to make that comparison." John Travolta said that the film was not inspired by Scientology tenets.

Hugh Urban of Ohio State University notes a number of connections between Scientology and Battlefield Earth in his 2011 book The Church of Scientology: A History of a New Religion. Not only was the film released only three days after the 50th anniversary of the publication of Hubbard's book Dianetics: The Modern Science of Mental Health, but the villainous Psychlos have been interpreted as an obvious allusion to Scientology's nemesis, psychiatry. The conflict between the Psychlos and the free humans can be seen as a reflection of Scientology's own conception of itself as fighting on behalf of humanity against the forces of psychiatry. The "space opera" genre of the book and film manifests itself in numerous places in Scientology itself, most famously in OT III (the Xenu story). Travolta's own commitment to such a disastrous project as the film version of Battlefield Earth is, in Urban's estimation, indicative of his "unusual dedication" to Scientology. Andy Greene, writing about the movie in 2023, likewise disputed that it was not meant as Scientology propaganda, though added, "It’s hard to imagine a single person converting to Scientology because of it. They were too busy falling asleep or laughing at the ridiculous sight of Travolta with dreadlocks."

== Lawsuit ==
Following the failure of Battlefield Earth and other films independently produced by Franchise Pictures, The Wall Street Journal reported that the FBI was probing "the question of whether some independent motion picture companies have vastly inflated the budget of films in an effort to scam investors". In December 2000, the German-based Intertainment AG [de] filed a lawsuit alleging that Franchise Pictures had fraudulently inflated budgets in films including Battlefield Earth, which Intertainment had helped to finance. Intertainment had agreed to pay 47% of the production costs of several films in exchange for European distribution rights, but ended up paying for between 60 and 90% of the costs instead. The company alleged that Franchise had defrauded it to the tune of over $75 million by systematically submitting "grossly fraudulent and inflated budgets".

The case was heard before a jury in a Los Angeles federal courtroom in May–June 2004. The court heard testimony from Intertainment that according to Franchise's bank records the real cost of Battlefield Earth was $44 million, not the $75 million declared by Franchise. The remaining $31 million had been fraudulent padding. Intertainment's head Barry Baeres told the court that he had only funded Battlefield Earth because it was packaged as a slate that included two more commercially attractive films, the Wesley Snipes vehicle The Art of War and the Bruce Willis comedy The Whole Nine Yards. Baeres testified that "Mr. Samaha said, 'If you want the other two pictures, you have to take Battlefield Earth — it's called packaging' ... We would have been quite happy if he had killed [Battlefield Earth]".

Intertainment won the case and was awarded $121.7 million in damages. Samaha was declared by the court to be personally liable for $77 million in damages. The jury rejected Intertainment's claims under the Racketeer Influenced and Corrupt Organizations Act (RICO) statute, which would have tripled the damages if Franchise had been convicted on that charge. The judgment forced Franchise into bankruptcy on August 18, 2004. The failure of the film was reported to have led, in 2002, to Travolta firing his manager Jonathan Krane, who had set up the deal with Franchise in the first place.

== Canceled follow-ups and sequels ==
Battlefield Earth covered only the first 436 pages of the 1,050-page book. A sequel covering the remainder of the book was planned. When asked during promotion of the film if there would be a Battlefield Earth 2, Travolta responded, "Sure. Yeah." Travolta asserted that the first film would become a cult classic, saying that there were already fan websites dedicated to the film. Corey Mandell, the scriptwriter for the first film, was commissioned to deliver the script for the sequel, and Travolta, Pepper and producer Krane were all signed up to the sequel in their contracts for the first film. Christian and Whitaker were approached to reprise their respective roles, and the producers planned for a 2003 release date so as not to compete with George Lucas' Star Wars: Episode II – Attack of the Clones.

Despite Travolta's initial commitment to a sequel, such plans never came to fruition. According to James Robert Parish's Fiasco: A History of Hollywood's Iconic Flops, the disastrous performance of Battlefield Earth and the collapse of Franchise Pictures made it very unlikely that a live-action sequel would be made. In a 2001 interview, Travolta said that a sequel was not planned: "Ultimately the movie did $100 million when you count box office, DVD sales, video, and pay per view ... But I don't know what kind of number it would have to do to justify filming the second part of the book. And I don't want to push any buttons in the press and stir anybody up about it now." Author Services announced in 2001 that Pine Com International, a Tokyo-based animation studio, would produce 13 one-hour animated television segments based on the book and rendered in a manga style. The plans appear to have fallen through, and according to Parish, "little has been heard of the series since."

== See also ==
- List of 21st-century films considered the worst

Awards
Preceded by Wild Wild West	Golden Raspberry Award for Worst Picture; 21st Golden Raspberry Awards	Succeeded by Freddy Got Fingered
