= We Married Margo =

- Film poster
- Directed by: J. David Shapiro
- Written by: J. David Shapiro; William Dozier
- Produced by: Karen Shapiro; Nancy Shapiro; Pamela Shapiro Schloss; Stephen Zakman
- Starring: J. David Shapiro; William Dozier; Kylie Bax; Jillian Johns; Sal Catalano
- Cinematography: Jeff Baustert
- Music by: Richard Bennett; Shawn Clement; Dan Schloss; Glenn Schloss
- Distributed by: New Line Cinema (USA); Koan (international)
- Release date: January 25, 2000 (Slamdance Film Festival)
- Running time: 85 minutes
- Country: United States
- Language: English

We Married Margo is a 2000 American independent comedy film directed by J. David Shapiro and co-written by Shapiro and William Dozier. The film tells a story of two friends who were married to the same woman and is loosely based on real events in that Shapiro and Dozier actually met after dating the same woman named Margaux. The film was awarded the Audience Award for Comedy Film of the Year at the 2000 Comedy Festival (formerly known as the US Comedy Arts Festival) and was nominated for the Grand Jury Prize at the Slamdance Film Festival the same year.

== Plot ==
Margo is a woman from New Jersey who marries a fellow New Jersey native, Jake. After it becomes evident that their marriage will not last, the two are divorced and Margo is remarried, this time to Rock, a California surfer. However, this marriage does not last long either and they are quickly divorced.

Jake and Rock were previously introduced to each other by Margo and, after they are both divorced from her, they form a friendship and live as roommates. The two have very little in common except for the fact that they married and divorced the same woman. They become best friends, even though they constantly irritate each other, and they decide to write a film based on their experience of being married to Margo. During their work on the project, they meet many more people just like them whose lives were impacted by Margo.

== Cast ==
- William Dozier as Rock
- J.D. Shapiro as Jake
- Jillian Johns as Tracy
- Sal Catalano as Jay
- Kylie Bax as Margo

== Cameos ==
The film featured cameo appearances by several actors, professional athletes and celebrities appearing as themselves. In the film, all of them have stories to tell about how Margo had an influence on their lives, though some of them never met her in person. The most notable of these cameos is Kevin Bacon’s explanation of Six degrees of Margo, a clear reference to the popular trivia game Six Degrees of Kevin Bacon.

The following is a partial list of cameo appearances in the film:

- Kevin Bacon
- Tom Arnold
- Maurice Benard
- Dan Cortese
- Cindy Crawford
- Erik Estrada
- Julie Moran
- Rob Moran
- Mark O'Meara
- Payne Stewart
- Victoria Tennant
