= 2000 Stinkers Bad Movie Awards =

Award ceremony presented by the Stinkers Bad Movie Awards in 2006

23rd Stinkers Bad Movie Awards
- Date: 2001

Highlights
- Worst Film: Battlefield Earth
- Most awards: Battlefield Earth (8)
- Most nominations: Battlefield Earth (9)

The 23rd Stinkers Bad Movie Awards were released by the Hastings Bad Cinema Society in 2001 to honour the worst films the film industry had to offer in 2000. The most nominated film of the year was Battlefield Earth with nine nominations, which also had eight wins. There were no listed percentages of votes for each nominee; however, this would resurface with next year's ballot. Dishonourable mentions are also featured for Worst Picture (32 total).

== Winners and nominees ==
=== Worst Picture ===
Film	Production company(s)
Battlefield Earth	Warner Bros.
Book of Shadows: Blair Witch 2	Artisan Entertainment
Dungeons & Dragons	New Line Cinema
Get Carter	Warner Bros.
Little Nicky	New Line Cinema

==== Dishonourable Mentions ====
- The Adventures of Rocky and Bullwinkle (Universal)
- Bamboozled (New Line)
- Big Momma's House (Fox)
- Bless the Child (Paramount)
- Boys and Girls (Miramax)
- The Cell (New Line)
- Charlie's Angels (Columbia)
- Coyote Ugly (Touchstone)
- The Crew (Touchstone)
- The Flintstones in Viva Rock Vegas (Universal)
- Godzilla 2000 (Sony)
- The Grinch (Universal)
- Hamlet (Miramax)
- Hanging Up (Sony)
- Hollow Man (Sony)
- I Dreamed of Africa (Sony)
- Mission to Mars (Touchstone)
- My 5 Wives (Artisan)
- The Next Best Thing (Paramount)
- The Ninth Gate (Artisan)
- Nutty Professor II: The Klumps (Universal)
- 102 Dalmatians (Disney)
- Passion of Mind (Paramount)
- Pokémon: The Movie 2000 (Warner Bros.)
- Red Planet (Warner Bros.)
- Scary Movie (Dimension)
- Screwed (Universal)
- Snow Day (Paramount)
- Supernova (MGM)
- Thomas and the Magic Railroad (Sony)
- Vertical Limit (Sony)
- The Watcher (Universal)
- What Planet Are You From? (Sony)
- Whipped (Sony)

=== Other Categories ===
Worst Director: Roger Christian for Battlefield Earth; Joe Berlinger for Book of Shadows: Blair Witch 2; Sally Field for Beautiful; Stephen T. Kay for Get Carter; Courtney Solomon for Dungeons & Dragons	Worst Screenplay for a Film Grossing More Than $100M Using Hollywood Math: Gone in 60 Seconds (Touchstone), written by Scott Rosenberg; based on the 1974 film of the same name; Big Momma's House (Fox), story by Darryl Quarles; screenplay by Quarles and Don Rhymer; Coyote Ugly (Touchstone), written by Todd Graff, Gina Wendkos, and Kevin Smith; Dinosaur (Disney), story by John Harrison, Robert Nelson Jacobs, Thom Enriquez, and Ralph Zondag; screenplay by Harrison and Jacobs; Hollow Man (Columbia), story by Gary Scott Thompson and Andrew W. Marlowe; screenplay by Marlowe
Worst Actor: John Travolta in Battlefield Earth and Lucky Numbers; Freddie Prinze Jr. in Boys and Girls and Down to You; Adam Sandler in Little Nicky; Sylvester Stallone in Get Carter; Damon Wayans in Bamboozled	Worst Actress: Madonna in The Next Best Thing; Kim Basinger in Bless the Child and I Dreamed of Africa; Melanie Griffith in Cecil B. Demented; Bette Midler in Isn't She Great; Winona Ryder in Autumn in New York and Lost Souls
Worst Supporting Actor: Tom Green in Charlie's Angels and Road Trip; Stephen Baldwin in The Flintstones in Viva Rock Vegas; Gerard Depardieu in 102 Dalmatians; Jeremy Irons in Dungeons & Dragons; Barry Pepper in Battlefield Earth	Worst Supporting Actress: Alicia Silverstone in Love's Labour's Lost; Rosanna Arquette in The Whole Nine Yards; Thora Birch in Dungeons & Dragons; Taylor Momsen in Dr. Seuss' How the Grinch Stole Christmas; Rene Russo in The Adventures of Rocky and Bullwinkle
Worst On-Screen Couple: John Travolta and anyone in the entire galaxy! in Battlefield Earth; Gerard Depardieu and Glenn Close in 102 Dalmatians; Richard Gere and Winona Ryder in Autumn in New York; Adam Sandler and that painfully unfunny pit-bull in Little Nicky; Arnold Schwarzenegger and Arnold Schwarzenegger in The 6th Day	Worst On-Screen Group: The Psychlos and Man-Animals in Battlefield Earth; The Angels in Charlie's Angels; The Coyotes in Coyote Ugly; The entire cast of Dungeons & Dragons; The Klumps in Nutty Professor II: The Klumps; The Old Coots in The Crew; The Scientists in Hollow Man; The Sisters (Meg Ryan, Diane Keaton, and Lisa Kudrow) in Hanging Up; The Tourists in Book of Shadows: Blair Witch 2; The Women in Dr. T & The Women
Most Painfully Unfunny Comedy: Drowning Mona (Sony); Dude, Where's My Car? (Fox); The Ladies Man (Paramount); Next Friday (New Line); 102 Dalmatians (Disney)	Most Unintentionally Funny Movie: Battlefield Earth (Warner Bros.); Bless the Child (Paramount); Book of Shadows: Blair Witch 2 (Artisan); Coyote Ugly (Touchstone); Hollow Man (Columbia)
Worst Song or Song Performance Featured in a Film or Its End Credits: "Who Let The Dogs Out?" by Baha Men from Rugrats in Paris; "American Pie" by Madonna from The Next Best Thing; "Can't Fight the Moonlight" by LeAnn Rimes from Coyote Ugly; "Christmas, Why Can't I Find You?" by Taylor Momsen from The Grinch; "Digga Digga Dog" by Chaz Shepard from 102 Dalmatians; The entire song score from Duets; "Independent Women, Part 1" by Destiny's Child from Charlie's Angels; "Space Cowboys (Yippe-Yi-Yay)" by NSYNC from Space Cowboys; "Take a Look Around" by Limp Bizkit from Mission: Impossible 2; "Viva Rock Vegas" by Ann-Margret from The Flintstones in Viva Rock Vegas	Most Intrusive Musical Score in a Major Motion Picture: Gone in 60 Seconds (Touchstone); Book of Shadows: Blair Witch 2 (Artisan); Disney's The Kid (Disney); Dungeons & Dragons (New Line); The Perfect Storm (Warner Bros.)
Least "Special" Special Effects: Battlefield Earth (Warner Bros.); Dr. T & The Women (Artisan); Dungeons & Dragons (New Line)	Worst Achievement in Animation: Digimon: The Movie (Fox); Casper's Haunted Christmas (Universal); Pokémon the Movie 2000 (Toho)
Most Annoying Fake Accent: Adam Sandler in Little Nicky; Rosanna Arquette in The Whole Nine Yards; Kevin Costner in Thirteen Days; Anna Paquin in X-Men; Dennis Quaid in Frequency; Damon Wayans in Bamboozled	Worst On-Screen Hairstyle: John Travolta and Forest Whitaker in Battlefield Earth; Stephen Baldwin in The Flintstones in Viva Rock Vegas; Jason Biggs in Loser; Gerard Depardieu in 102 Dalmatians; Iben Hjejle in High Fidelity; Samuel L. Jackson in Unbreakable; Angelina Jolie in Gone in 60 Seconds; Taylor Momsen in The Grinch; Busta Rhymes in Finding Forrester; Adam Sandler in Little Nicky
Worst Resurrection of a TV Show: The Flintstones in Viva Rock Vegas (Universal); The Adventures of Rocky and Bullwinkle (Universal); Charlie's Angels (Columbia)	Most Unwelcome Direct-To-Video Release: The Extreme Adventures of Super Dave; Air Bud: World Pup; Beethoven's 3rd; Casper's Haunted Christmas; The Land Before Time VII: The Stone of Cold Fire
Worst Remake or Sequel: Book of Shadows: Blair Witch 2 (Artisan); The Flintstones in Viva Rock Vegas (Universal); Get Carter (Warner Bros.); Highlander: Endgame (Miramax); Nutty Professor II: The Klumps (Universal)	The Remake or Sequel Nobody Was Clamoring For: Book of Shadows: Blair Witch 2 (Artisan); All films with "2000" in the title (Dracula, Fantasia, Godzilla, Heavy Metal, Pokémon, and a retro award to Blues Brothers 2000); The Flintstones in Viva Rock Vegas (Universal); Next Friday (New Line); 102 Dalmatians (Disney)
Musicians and Athletes Who Shouldn't Be Acting: Madonna in The Next Best Thing; The entire WCW roster in Ready to Rumble; k.d. lang in Eye of the Beholder; LeAnn Rimes in Isn't She Great; Mike Tyson in Black & White	Oldest-Looking Teenagers: Remember the Titans (Disney); Bring It On (Universal); Center Stage (Columbia); Loser (Columbia); Road Trip (DreamWorks)
Most Annoying Product Placement: FedEx and Wilson in Cast Away; Virgin Megastores in Dracula 2000; Popeyes Chicken in Little Nicky	Most Unfunny Comic Relief: Tom Green in any movie (this year: Charlie's Angels and Road Trip); Alan Cumming as The Great Gazoo and Mick Jagged in The Flintstones in Viva Rock Vegas; Marlon Wayans as Jar Jar Binks in Dungeons & Dragons; 90% of Scary Movie; The painfully unfunny talking pit-bull in Little Nicky
The Founders Award: The M.P.A.A. for rating Scary Movie R

== Films with multiple wins and nominations ==
The following films received multiple nominations:

Nominations	Film
9	Battlefield Earth
8	Dungeons & Dragons
7	Book of Shadows: Blair Witch 2
7	The Flintstones in Viva Rock Vegas
7	Little Nicky
6	102 Dalmatians
5	Charlie's Angels
4	Coyote Ugly
4	Get Carter
3	Gone in 60 Seconds
3	The Grinch
3	Hollow Man
3	The Next Best Thing
3	Road Trip
2	The Adventures of Rocky and Bullwinkle
2	Autumn in New York
2	Bamboozled
2	Bless the Child
2	Casper's Haunted Christmas
2	Dr. T & The Women
2	Dracula 2000
2	Isn't She Great
2	Loser
2	Next Friday
2	Nutty Professor II: The Klumps
2	Pokémon the Movie 2000
2	Scary Movie *
2	The Whole Nine Yards

- Note: For each film with an asterisk, one of those nominations was the Founders Award.

The following films received multiple wins:

Wins	Film
8	Battlefield Earth
2	Book of Shadows: Blair Witch 2
2	Charlie's Angels
2	Gone in 60 Seconds
2	The Next Best Thing
2	Road Trip
