= Kylie Bax =

New Zealand model and actress

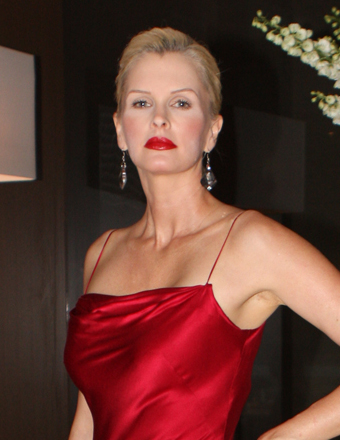
- Bax in 2012
- Born: 5 January 1975 (age 51); Thames, Waikato, New Zealand
- Children: 3
- Modeling information
- Height: 1.78 m (5 ft 10.08 in)
- Hair color: Blonde
- Eye color: Grey/Green
- Agency: Women Management (New York); Elite Model Management (Amsterdam); Front Management (Miami)

Kylie Bax (born 5 January 1975) is a New Zealand–based model and actress. She has appeared on international magazine covers, including Vogue and Marie Claire. During her twenties, Bax had supporting roles in action and comedy films.

== Personal life ==
Bax grew up on her parents' horse-breeding farm in Thames, New Zealand. As of 2015, Bax and her estranged husband were embroiled in a contentious divorce. In 2016 and 2017, she publicly supported the election of Donald Trump as President of the United States.

== Modeling career ==
Bax (left) with Donald Trump, Bill Clinton (at that time the President of the United States), and Melania Knauss (future Trump) at the US Open in 2000, Flushing, New York

Having been a teenage model, Bax was first discovered in a New Zealand shopping mall by an agent from the modelling agency Clyne Model Management. After discovering her marketing abilities as a fashion model, she soon moved to New York to work as a model. Bax became Steven Meisel's protégé. She went on to work with top photographers such as Karl Lagerfeld, Helmut Newton, and Richard Avedon. Once discovered, she became an international modelling success, signing with Women in New York, Marilyn in Paris, and Storm in London. She has appeared on numerous international magazine covers, including Vogue, Marie Claire, Harper's Bazaar & Mode Australia, Maxim, Vanity Fair and ELLE. She has also appeared on more than twenty Vogue covers around the world.

In 2000, Bax appeared in the annual Sports Illustrated Swimsuit Issue. She has appeared in advertising campaigns for such products as Club Monaco, Anna Sui, Clinique, Ann Taylor, DKNY, Escada, Gianfranco Ferre, Giorgio Armani, Louis Vuitton, Oscar de la Renta, Sonia Rykiel, Versace, Moschino, Nars, and Valentino. She has appeared on catwalks for high fashion houses such as Moschino, Oscar de la Renta, Chanel, Christian Dior, Christian Lacroix, and Valentino, Gucci, Galliano, Donna Karan, Cynthia Rowley, Calvin Klein, Joop, Alexander McQueen, Phillip Treacy, Karl Lagerfeld, Chloe, Ralph Lauren, Prada, King Baby Studios, and Miu Miu.

In 2006, Bax sued the French men's magazine Max Magazine for using bare-breasted images of her on its magazine wrapper. No photos of her were inside the publication. Her lawsuit cited that the "sexualised nature of the photographs was inconsistent with the image that she had sought to develop". The images had been taken about six years earlier, and she had not been compensated for their use by Max Magazine. The photographer had been assured that they would not be published without her consent.

== Acting career ==
Between 1999 and 2005, Bax played supporting roles in eight different films.

=== Filmography ===
- Tennis, Anyone...? (2005) as Christy
- Get Over It (2001) as Dora Lynn Tisdale
- Perfume (2001) as Maitre D'
- Boys and Girls (2000) as Supermodel
- Jill Rips (2000) as Serena
- We Married Margo (2000) as Margo
- The Big Tease (1999) as Stig's Hair Model
- Storm Catcher (1999) as Jessica Holloway
