= 30th Golden Raspberry Awards =

Awards ceremony presented to films of 2009

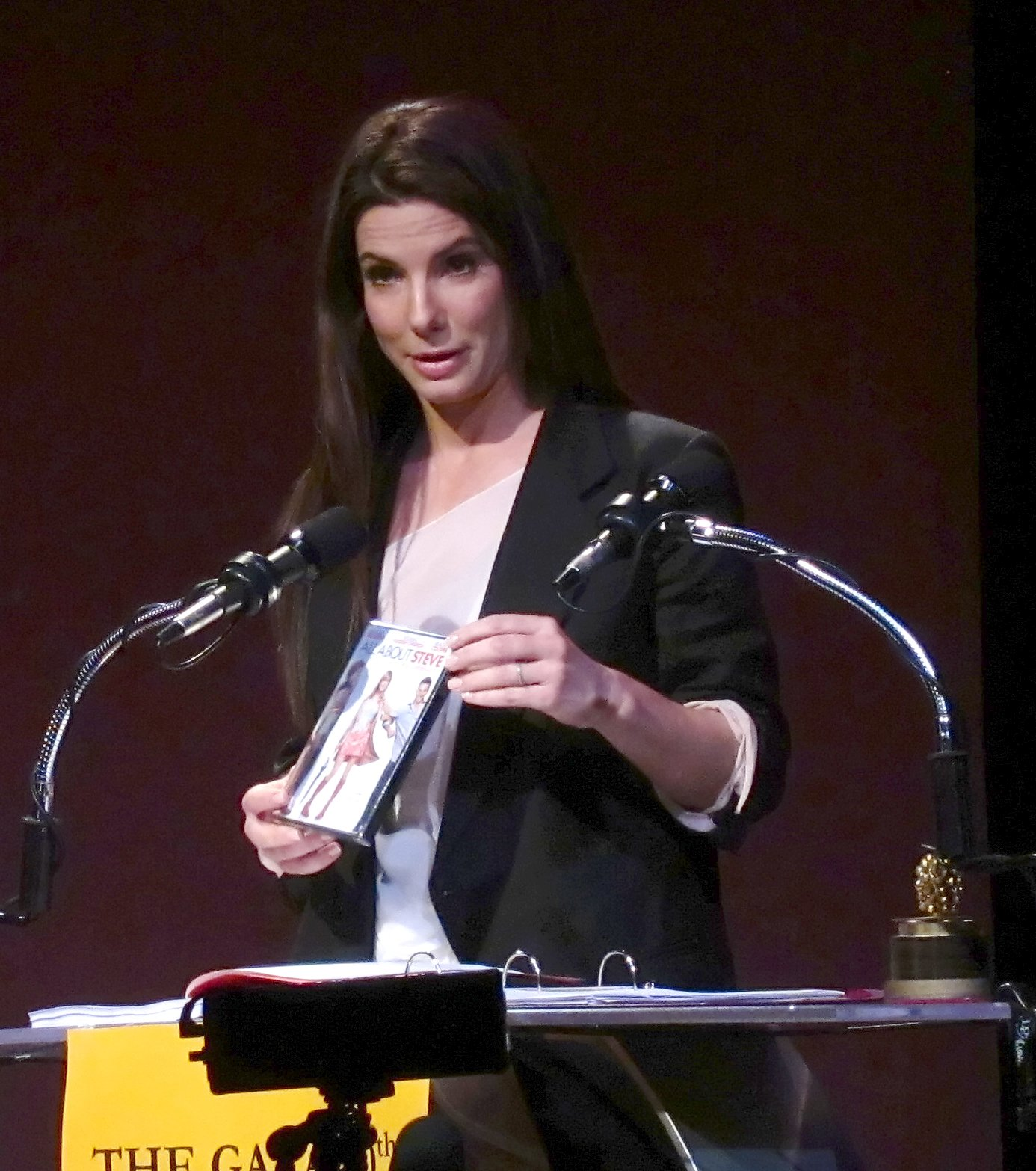
- Sandra Bullock accepting her award
- Date: March 6, 2010
- Site: Barnsdall Gallery Theatre, Hollywood, California

Highlights
- Worst Picture: Transformers: Revenge of the Fallen
- Most awards: Transformers: Revenge of the Fallen (3)
- Most nominations: Land of the Lost / Transformers: Revenge of the Fallen (7)

The 30th Golden Raspberry Awards, or Razzies, were held on March 6, 2010, in Hollywood, California, to honor the worst films the film industry had to offer in 2009, according to votes from members of the Golden Raspberry Foundation. Razzies co-founder John J. B. Wilson has stated that the intent of the awards is "to be funny." Per Razzies tradition, both the nominee announcements and ceremony preceded the corresponding Academy Awards functions by one day. Additional awards for Worst Picture, Actor, and Actress of the Decade honored the worst achievements in film in the 2000s decade. The nominees were announced on February 1.

The winners were announced on March 6. After the hosts presented Sandra Bullock as Worst Actress, one of the presenters parodied Kanye West's controversial protest against Taylor Swift at the 2009 MTV Video Music Awards. Then, Bullock appeared to accept her Worst Actress and Worst Screen Couple awards for All About Steve, and presented DVD copies of the film to the audience, saying the Razzie voters cast ballots for her just to see if she would appear at the ceremony, in comparison to her Academy Award for Best Actress. Bullock was later asked to return her statue, as she was inadvertently given the original, 30-year-old Razzie Statue, as opposed to the replicas given to winners. She went on to win the Academy Award for Best Actress for her role in The Blind Side the following night, making her the first actress to win both a Razzie and an Academy Award in the same year, and third person overall, after composer Alan Menken (in 1993) and screenwriter Brian Helgeland (in 1998).

Screenwriter J. David Shapiro, who co-wrote Battlefield Earth, also appeared in person to accept the award for Worst Picture of the Decade.

== Winners and nominees ==
Winner (in bold)

Category	Photos	Recipient
Worst Picture		**Transformers: Revenge of the Fallen (DreamWorks/Paramount/Hasbro)**
Worst Picture		All About Steve (20th Century Fox/Fortis)
Worst Picture		G.I. Joe: The Rise of Cobra (Paramount/Hasbro/Spyglass)
Worst Picture		Land of the Lost (Universal)
Worst Picture		Old Dogs (Disney)
Worst Actor	Jonas Brothers 2009	**Jonas Brothers in Jonas Brothers: The 3D Concert Experience as themselves**
Worst Actor	Jonas Brothers 2009	Will Ferrell in Land of the Lost as Dr. Rick Marshall
Worst Actor	Jonas Brothers 2009	Steve Martin in The Pink Panther 2 as Inspector Jacques Clouseau
Worst Actor	Jonas Brothers 2009	Eddie Murphy in Imagine That as Evan Danielson
Worst Actor	Jonas Brothers 2009	John Travolta in Old Dogs as Charlie Reed
Worst Actress		**Sandra Bullock in All About Steve as Mary Horowitz**
Worst Actress		Beyoncé in Obsessed as Sharon Charles
Worst Actress		Miley Cyrus in Hannah Montana: The Movie as Miley Stewart/Hannah Montana
Worst Actress		Megan Fox in Jennifer's Body and Transformers: Revenge of the Fallen as Jennifer Check and Mikaela Banes (respectively)
Worst Actress		Sarah Jessica Parker in Did You Hear About the Morgans? as Meryl Morgan
Worst Supporting Actor		**Billy Ray Cyrus in Hannah Montana: The Movie as Robby Ray Stewart**
Worst Supporting Actor		Hugh Hefner (as himself) in Miss March
Worst Supporting Actor		Robert Pattinson in The Twilight Saga: New Moon as Edward Cullen
Worst Supporting Actor		Jorma Taccone in Land of the Lost as Cha-Ka
Worst Supporting Actor		Marlon Wayans in G.I. Joe: The Rise of Cobra as Ripcord
Worst Supporting Actress		**Sienna Miller in G.I. Joe: The Rise of Cobra as The Baroness**
Worst Supporting Actress		Candice Bergen in Bride Wars as Marion St. Claire
Worst Supporting Actress		Ali Larter in Obsessed as Lisa Sheridan
Worst Supporting Actress		Kelly Preston in Old Dogs as Vicki Greer
Worst Supporting Actress		Julie White in Transformers: Revenge of the Fallen as Judy Witwicky
Worst Screen Couple		**Sandra Bullock and Bradley Cooper in All About Steve**
Worst Screen Couple		Any two (or more) Jonas Brothers in Jonas Brothers: The 3D Concert Experience
Worst Screen Couple		Will Ferrell and any co-star, creature or "comic riff" in Land of the Lost
Worst Screen Couple		Shia LaBeouf and either Megan Fox or any Transformer in Transformers: Revenge of the Fallen
Worst Screen Couple		Kristen Stewart and either Taylor Lautner or Robert Pattinson in The Twilight Saga: New Moon
Worst Prequel, Remake, Rip-off or Sequel		**Land of the Lost (Universal)**
Worst Prequel, Remake, Rip-off or Sequel		G.I. Joe: The Rise of Cobra (Paramount/Hasbro/Spyglass)
Worst Prequel, Remake, Rip-off or Sequel		The Pink Panther 2 (MGM/Columbia)
Worst Prequel, Remake, Rip-off or Sequel		Transformers: Revenge of the Fallen (DreamWorks/Paramount/Hasbro)
Worst Prequel, Remake, Rip-off or Sequel		The Twilight Saga: New Moon (Summit)
Worst Director		**Michael Bay for Transformers: Revenge of the Fallen**
Worst Director		Walt Becker for Old Dogs
Worst Director		Brad Silberling for Land of the Lost
Worst Director		Stephen Sommers for G.I. Joe: The Rise of Cobra
Worst Director		Phil Traill for All About Steve
Worst Screenplay	Roberto Orci Alex Kurtzman	**Transformers: Revenge of the Fallen (written by Ehren Kruger, Roberto Orci & Alex Kurtzman, based on the toy line by Hasbro)**
Worst Screenplay	Roberto Orci Alex Kurtzman	All About Steve (written by Kim Barker)
Worst Screenplay	Roberto Orci Alex Kurtzman	G.I. Joe: The Rise of Cobra (screenplay by Stuart Beattie, David Elliot & Paul Lovett; story by Beattie, Michael B. Gordon & Stephen Sommers, based on the comic book by Larry Hama)
Worst Screenplay	Roberto Orci Alex Kurtzman	Land of the Lost (written by Chris Henchy & Dennis McNicholas; based on the television series created by Sid and Marty Krofft)
Worst Screenplay	Roberto Orci Alex Kurtzman	The Twilight Saga: New Moon (screenplay by Melissa Rosenberg; based on the novel by Stephenie Meyer)

=== Worst of the Decade ===
Category	Photo	Recipient
Worst Actor of the Decade	Eddie Murphy	**Eddie Murphy for The Adventures of Pluto Nash, I Spy, Imagine That, Meet Dave, Norbit and Showtime**
Worst Actor of the Decade	Eddie Murphy	Ben Affleck for Daredevil, Gigli, Jersey Girl, Paycheck, Pearl Harbor and Surviving Christmas
Worst Actor of the Decade	Eddie Murphy	Mike Myers for The Cat in the Hat and The Love Guru
Worst Actor of the Decade	Eddie Murphy	Rob Schneider for The Animal, The Benchwarmers, Deuce Bigalow: European Gigolo, Grandma's Boy, The Hot Chick, I Now Pronounce You Chuck and Larry, Little Man and Little Nicky
Worst Actor of the Decade	Eddie Murphy	John Travolta for Battlefield Earth, Domestic Disturbance, Lucky Numbers, Old Dogs and Swordfish
Worst Actress of the Decade	Paris Hilton	**Paris Hilton for The Hottie and the Nottie, House of Wax and Repo! The Genetic Opera**
Worst Actress of the Decade	Paris Hilton	Mariah Carey for Glitter
Worst Actress of the Decade	Paris Hilton	Lindsay Lohan for Herbie: Fully Loaded, I Know Who Killed Me and Just My Luck
Worst Actress of the Decade	Paris Hilton	Jennifer Lopez for Angel Eyes, Enough, Gigli, Jersey Girl, Maid in Manhattan, Monster-in-Law and The Wedding Planner
Worst Actress of the Decade	Paris Hilton	Madonna for Die Another Day, The Next Best Thing and Swept Away
Worst Picture of the Decade		**Battlefield Earth (2000, Warner Bros.) (winner of seven Razzies in 2001)**
Worst Picture of the Decade		Freddy Got Fingered (2001, 20th Century Fox) (winner of five Razzies in 2002)
Worst Picture of the Decade		Gigli (2003, Columbia) (winner of six Razzies in 2004)
Worst Picture of the Decade		I Know Who Killed Me (2007, TriStar) (winner of eight Razzies in 2008)
Worst Picture of the Decade		Swept Away (2002, Screen Gems) (winner of five Razzies in 2003)

== Films with multiple nominations ==
These films received multiple nominations:

Nominations	Films
7	Land of the Lost
7	Transformers: Revenge of the Fallen
6	G.I. Joe: The Rise of Cobra
5	All About Steve
4	Old Dogs
4	The Twilight Saga: New Moon
2	Hannah Montana: The Movie
2	Jonas Brothers: The 3D Concert Experience
2	Obsessed
2	The Pink Panther 2

== See also ==
- 2009 in film
- 82nd Academy Awards
- 67th Golden Globe Awards
- 16th Screen Actors Guild Awards
