= Roger Christian =

Roger Christian may refer to:

- Roger Christian (songwriter) (1934–1991), American radio personality and lyricist
- Roger Christian (ice hockey) (1935–2011), American Olympic ice hockey player
- Roger Christian (filmmaker) (born 1944), British set decorator, production designer, and film director
- Roger Christian (Emerson Stevens), American radio personality currently at WECK
- Roger Christian, British musician, member of the band The Christians
