= All About Steve =

2009 film by Phil Traill

- Theatrical release poster
- Directed by: Phil Traill
- Written by: Kim Barker
- Produced by: Sandra Bullock; Mary McLaglen
- Starring: Sandra Bullock; Thomas Haden Church; Bradley Cooper
- Cinematography: Tim Suhrstedt
- Edited by: Virginia Katz
- Music by: Christophe Beck
- Production companies: Fox 2000 Pictures; Radar Pictures; Fortis Films
- Distributed by: 20th Century Fox
- Release date: September 4, 2009
- Running time: 99 minutes
- Country: United States
- Language: English
- Budget: $15 million
- Box office: $40.1 million

All About Steve is a 2009 American romantic comedy film directed by Phil Traill, and starring Sandra Bullock, Thomas Haden Church and Bradley Cooper as the eponymous Steve. The film is the winner of two Golden Raspberry Awards and has a 7% approval rating at Rotten Tomatoes.

== Plot ==
Mary Horowitz, a crossword puzzle writer for the Sacramento Herald, is socially awkward and considers her pet hamster her only true friend. Her parents decide to set her up on a blind date.

Mary is pleasantly surprised when her date turns out to be handsome and charming Steve Miller, a cameraman for the television news network CCN. After an attempt at an intimate moment fails, in part because of her awkwardness and inability to stop talking about vocabulary, Steve fakes a phone call about covering the news out of town. Trying to get Mary out of his truck, he tells her he wishes she could be there.

Mary believes Steve, so she decides to pursue him. Her obsession gets her fired when she creates a crossword titled "All About Steve". Following her termination, Mary track Steve around the country in the hopes of winning his affection. She is encouraged by CCN news reporter Hartman Hughes, who hopes to use Mary's encyclopedic knowledge in his reports to help get promoted to news anchor.

On the road, Mary annoys some bus passengers so much, the driver abandons her. She hitchhikes with a trucker named Norm, then travels with a pair of protesters: Elizabeth, a ditzy but sweet and likeable girl, and Howard, who sells apples he carves into celebrities. She gradually grows close to the two.

Steve and crew cover a breaking news story: a mine collapse with numerous deaf children stuck inside. Initially, it appears that the children are rescued. Mary, who arrives on the scene, accidentally falls into the mine shaft as well while making a beeline for Steve.

It turns out that not all the children have been rescued, and Mary is trapped with one left behind. Steve begins to realize that Mary, in her own way, is a beautiful person. Just as she figures a way out of the mine, the two are joined by Hartman, who is made to feel guilty by Elizabeth and Howard for getting Mary into this predicament. Mary's rescue plan works, but she lets Hartman take the credit. She finally realizes she does not need Steve to be happy. In a voiceover, she says, "If you love someone, set him free; if you have to stalk him, he probably wasn't yours in the first place."

After the end credits, a competitive TV reporter, in despair that Hartman gained popularity by jumping into the sinkhole to save Mary, also jumps into it.

== Cast ==
- Sandra Bullock as Mary Magdalene Horowitz
- Bradley Cooper as Steven "Steve" Miller
- Thomas Haden Church as Hartman Hughes
- Ken Jeong as Angus Tran
- DJ Qualls as Howard
- Katy Mixon as Elizabeth
- Beth Grant as Mrs. Horowitz
- Howard Hesseman as Mr. Horowitz
- M. C. Gainey as Norman James "Norm" Durwood
- Luenell as Protester's wife
- Jordan Morris as Protester Winston
- Keith David as Danny
- Holmes Osborne as Soloman
- Jason Jones as Vazquez
- Noah Munck as Student
- Rachel Sterling as Booby Botanist

== Production ==
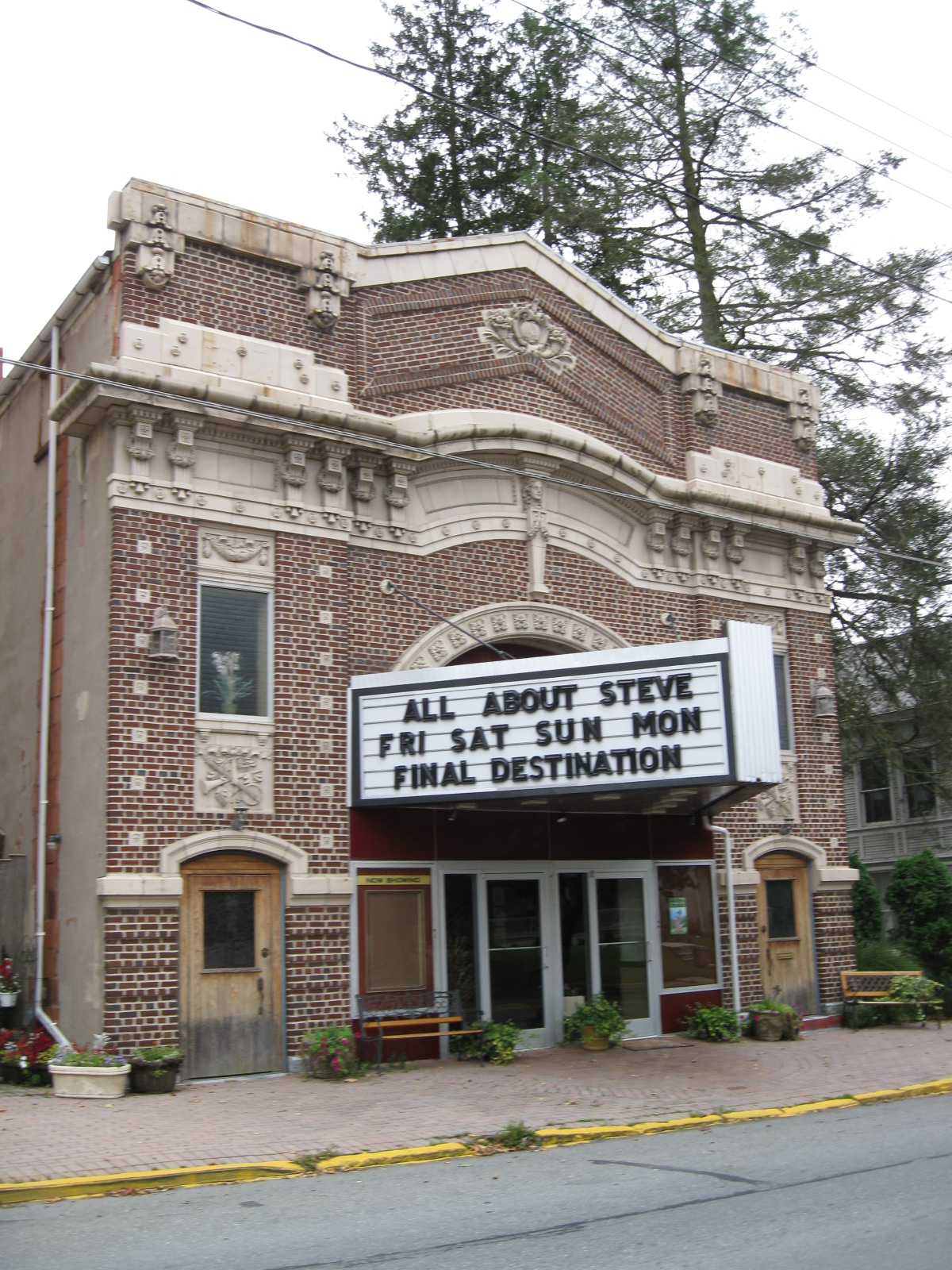
All About Steve at a Pine Grove, PA theater

In October 2006, it was announced that Fox 2000 Pictures had acquired the Kim Barker penned spec script All About Steve to be developed as a starring vehicle for Sandra Bullock. In June 2007, it was announced Bradley Cooper had been signed on to co-star.

Production began in July 2007. Parts of the film were shot at Mayfield Senior School in Pasadena, California. Scenes featuring the collapsed mine and sink hole were filmed at The Walt Disney Company's Golden Oak Ranch near Santa Clarita, California. Originally scheduled for release on March 6, 2009, the film was not released until September 4, 2009.

== Release ==
All About Steve opened at #3 behind the previous two weeks' #1 openers, The Final Destination and Inglourious Basterds with $11.2 million. The film grossed $33.8 million at the North American box office, and has a worldwide total of $40.1 million.

== Reception ==
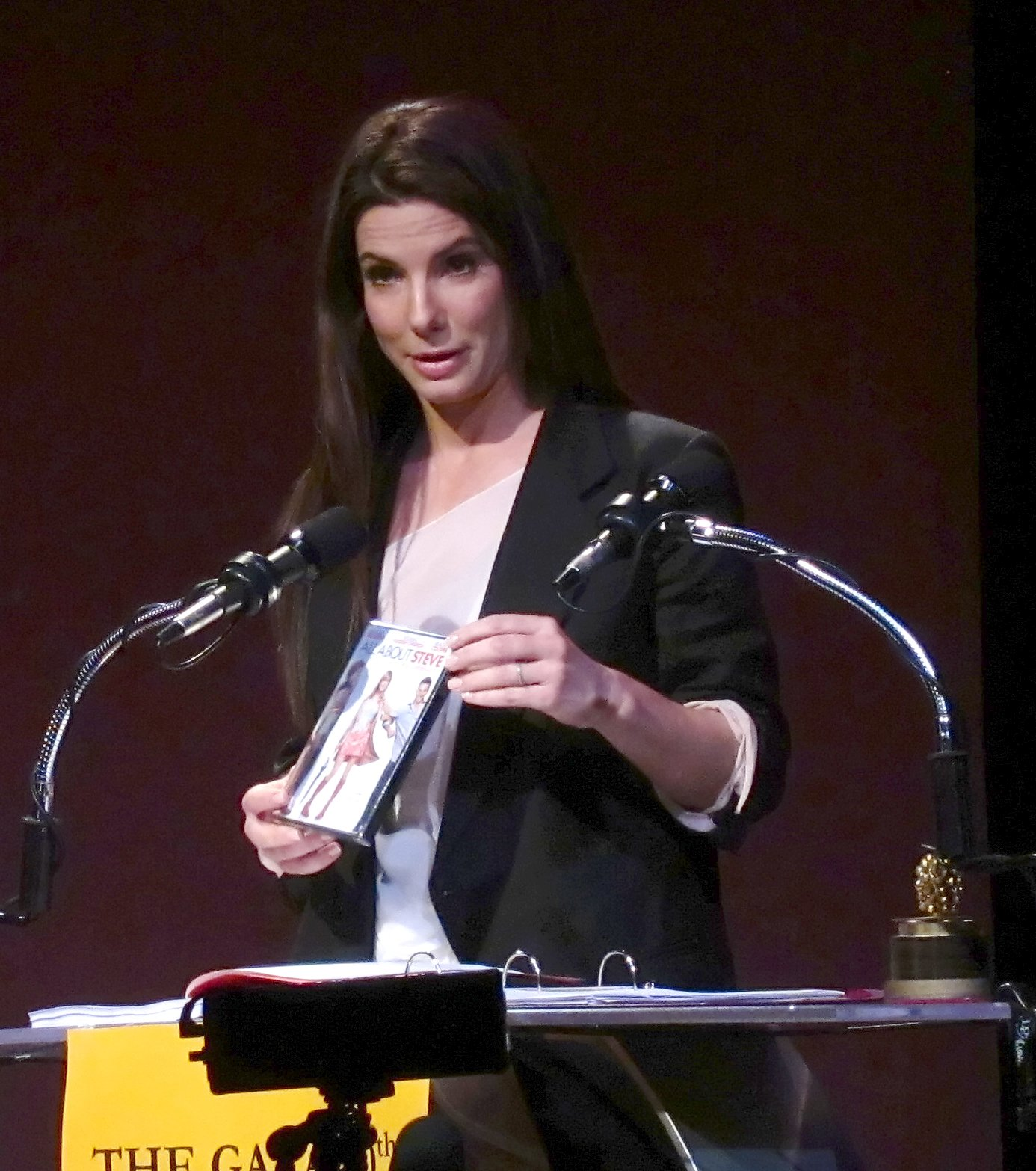
Bullock accepting the Razzie

Rotten Tomatoes assigned the film an approval rating of 7% based on 138 reviews with a rating average of 3.1/10. The site's critics consensus states: "All About Steve is an oddly creepy, sour film, featuring a heroine so desperate and peculiar that audiences may be more likely to pity than root for her." Another review aggregator, Metacritic, gave the film an average score of 17 out of 100 based on 27 critics, indicating "overwhelming dislike". Audiences polled by CinemaScore gave the film an average grade of "C+" on an A+ to F scale.

Roger Ebert gave the film one and a half stars out of four. Time named it one of the top ten worst chick flicks.

=== Accolades ===
The film was nominated for five Golden Raspberry Awards in 2010, including Worst Picture, Worst Director (Phil Traill), Worst Actress (Sandra Bullock), Worst Screenplay (Kim Barker) and Worst Screen Couple (Sandra Bullock and Bradley Cooper). All About Steve ultimately won Worst Actress and Worst Screen Couple. Sandra Bullock accepted the Razzie for Worst Actress in person, giving out a copy of All About Steve to each member of the audience, promising to attend next year if they all watched to consider if it was "truly the worst performance". When an audience member thanked her for the copies, Bullock replied "You say that now". She won the Academy Award for Best Actress for The Blind Side the next day, making Bullock one of the few performers to win an Academy Award and a Razzie Award in the same year.
