= J. David Shapiro =

American filmmaker and stand-up comedian (born 1969)

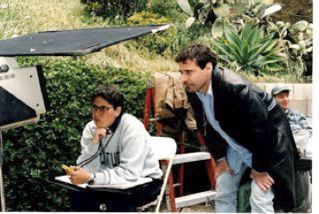
- Born: Jake David Shapiro; March 18, 1969 (age 57)
- Other names: JD Shapiro, J.D. Shapiro
- Awards: Worst Screenplay – 21st Razzie Awards; 2001 Battlefield Earth
- Website: www.jdshapiro.com

Jake David Shapiro (born March 18, 1969) is an American filmmaker and stand-up comedian. His screenwriting credits include the comedy Robin Hood: Men in Tights and the adaptation of L. Ron Hubbard's novel Battlefield Earth.

Battlefield Earth won more Golden Raspberry Awards than any other film up to that point (until Jack and Jill broke its record), and Shapiro accepted the dubious award in person. Shapiro was fired from the film due to creative disagreements during pre-production and wanted to be credited with a pseudonym, and also said little or nothing of his script remained in the final film after extensive re-writes. Shapiro later apologized for involvement in the widely panned film.

== Filmography ==
Year	Name	Role	Notes
1990	Duet	Screenwriter (episode ''I Never Played for My Father: Part 1'')	TV series
1990	Who's the Boss?	Screenwriter	TV series
1990	Charles in Charge	Screenwriter (episode "Buddy Flips a Disc")	TV series
1993	Robin Hood: Men in Tights	Screenwriter	Theatrical film
2000	We Married Margo	Director, screenwriter, actor (as ''Jake'')	Theatrical film
2000	Battlefield Earth	Screenwriter	Theatrical film
2006	Pucked	Actor (as ''Alan'')	Theatrical film
2007	The Strand	Actor	Direct-to-video
2008	X-Treme Biography: Santa	Screenwriter, actor (as ''AA Attendee / Death'')	TV short
2011	Juan Hombre	Co-director, screenwriter	Short
2012	unCONventional	Creative consultant (12 episodes)	TV series
2015	A Date	Special thanks	Short
2016	Actors	Actor (as ''Walk of fame actor'')	Short
2017	Extraordinary: Stan Lee	Himself	Direct-to-video documentary
2017	Best Thanksgiving Ever	Director	Theatrical film
2018	Hard Day's Nights	Co-director, screenwriter, executive producer	Short
2018	597 Días Desaparecido	Actor (as ''Tom Springfield'')	Short

== Awards and nominations ==
Year	Award	Work	Category	Result
2000	The Comedy Festival	We Married Margo	Audience Award	Won
2000	Slamdance Film Festival	We Married Margo	Grand Jury Prize	Nominated
2001	Golden Raspberry Award	Battlefield Earth	Worst Screenplay	Won

== See also ==
- List of people who accepted Golden Raspberry Awards
