= 21st Golden Raspberry Awards =

Award ceremony presented by the Golden Raspberry Award Foundation in 2000

- Date: March 24, 2001
- Site: Radisson-Huntley Hotel, Santa Monica, California

Highlights
- Worst Picture: Battlefield Earth
- Most awards: Battlefield Earth (7)
- Most nominations: Battlefield Earth (8)

The 21st Golden Raspberry Awards were held on March 24, 2001, at the Radisson-Huntley Hotel in Santa Monica, California, USA, to recognize the worst the movie industry had to offer in 2000.

Science fiction film Battlefield Earth swept the awards, claiming victory in all seven categories in which it was nominated (from a total of eight nominations, with its double nomination in the Supporting Actor category). J.D. Shapiro later accepted his Worst Screenplay award in a radio program. The record was then beaten by Jack and Jill (with the total of 12 nominations and 10 wins).

== Awards and nominations ==
Winner (in bold)

Category		Recipient
Worst Picture		**Battlefield Earth (Warner Bros.)**
Worst Picture		Book of Shadows: Blair Witch 2 (Artisan)
Worst Picture		The Flintstones in Viva Rock Vegas (Universal)
Worst Picture		Little Nicky (New Line)
Worst Picture		The Next Best Thing (Paramount)
Worst Actor		**John Travolta in Battlefield Earth and Lucky Numbers as Terl and Russ Richards (respectively)**
Worst Actor		Leonardo DiCaprio in The Beach as Richard
Worst Actor		Adam Sandler in Little Nicky as Nicky
Worst Actor		Arnold Schwarzenegger (as the **real** Adam Gibson) in The 6th Day
Worst Actor		Sylvester Stallone in Get Carter as Jack Carter
Worst Actress	Madonna	**Madonna in The Next Best Thing as Abbie Reynolds**
Worst Actress	Madonna	Kim Basinger in Bless the Child and I Dreamed of Africa as Maggie O'Connor and Kuki Gallmann (respectively)
Worst Actress	Madonna	Melanie Griffith in Cecil B. Demented as Honey Whitlock
Worst Actress	Madonna	Bette Midler in Isn't She Great as Jacqueline Susann
Worst Actress	Madonna	Demi Moore in Passion of Mind as Martha Marie "Marty" Talridge
Worst Supporting Actor	Barry Pepper	**Barry Pepper in Battlefield Earth as Jonnie Goodboy Tyler**
Worst Supporting Actor	Barry Pepper	Stephen Baldwin in The Flintstones in Viva Rock Vegas as Barney Rubble
Worst Supporting Actor	Barry Pepper	Keanu Reeves in The Watcher as David Allen Griffin
Worst Supporting Actor	Barry Pepper	Arnold Schwarzenegger (as the **clone** of Adam Gibson) in The 6th Day
Worst Supporting Actor	Barry Pepper	Forest Whitaker in Battlefield Earth as Ker
Worst Supporting Actress	Kelly Preston	**Kelly Preston in Battlefield Earth as Chirk**
Worst Supporting Actress	Kelly Preston	Patricia Arquette in Little Nicky as Valerie Veran
Worst Supporting Actress	Kelly Preston	Joan Collins in The Flintstones in Viva Rock Vegas as Pearl Slaghoople
Worst Supporting Actress	Kelly Preston	Thandiwe Newton in Mission: Impossible 2 as Nyah Nordoff-Hall
Worst Supporting Actress	Kelly Preston	Rene Russo in The Adventures of Rocky and Bullwinkle as Natasha Fatale
Worst Screen Couple		**John Travolta and anyone sharing the screen with him in Battlefield Earth**
Worst Screen Couple		Any two actors in Book of Shadows: Blair Witch 2
Worst Screen Couple		Richard Gere and Winona Ryder in Autumn in New York
Worst Screen Couple		Madonna and either Rupert Everett or Benjamin Bratt in The Next Best Thing
Worst Screen Couple		Arnold Schwarzenegger (as the **real** Adam Gibson) and Arnold Schwarzenegger (as the **clone** of Adam Gibson) in The 6th Day
Worst Remake or Sequel		**Book of Shadows: Blair Witch 2 (Artisan)**
Worst Remake or Sequel		The Flintstones in Viva Rock Vegas (Universal)
Worst Remake or Sequel		Get Carter (Warner Bros.)
Worst Remake or Sequel		How the Grinch Stole Christmas (Universal)
Worst Remake or Sequel		Mission: Impossible 2 (Paramount)
Worst Director	Roger Christian, director of Battlefield Earth	**Roger Christian for Battlefield Earth**
Worst Director	Roger Christian, director of Battlefield Earth	Joe Berlinger for Book of Shadows: Blair Witch 2
Worst Director	Roger Christian, director of Battlefield Earth	Steven Brill for Little Nicky
Worst Director	Roger Christian, director of Battlefield Earth	Brian De Palma for Mission to Mars
Worst Director	Roger Christian, director of Battlefield Earth	John Schlesinger for The Next Best Thing
Worst Screenplay		**Battlefield Earth – screenplay by Corey Mandell and J. David Shapiro, based on the novel by L. Ron Hubbard**
Worst Screenplay		Book of Shadows: Blair Witch 2 – written by Dick Beebe and Joe Berlinger
Worst Screenplay		How the Grinch Stole Christmas – screenplay by Jeffrey Price and Peter S. Seaman, based on the book by Dr. Seuss
Worst Screenplay		Little Nicky – screenplay by Tim Herlihy, Adam Sandler and Steven Brill
Worst Screenplay		The Next Best Thing – written by Tom Ropelewski

== Films with multiple nominations ==
These films received multiple nominations:

Nominations	Films
8	Battlefield Earth
5	Book of Shadows: Blair Witch 2
5	Little Nicky
5	The Next Best Thing
4	The Flintstones in Viva Rock Vegas
3	The 6th Day
2	Get Carter
2	How the Grinch Stole Christmas
2	Mission: Impossible 2

== See also ==
- 2000 in film
- 73rd Academy Awards
- 54th British Academy Film Awards
- 58th Golden Globe Awards
- 27th Saturn Awards
- 7th Screen Actors Guild Awards
