= List of Dinosaurs episodes =

This is a list of episodes for the early-1990s television series Dinosaurs.

== Series overview ==
Season	Episodes		Originally released		
Season	Episodes		First released	Last released	Network
1	5		April 26, 1991	May 24, 1991	ABC
2	24		September 18, 1991	May 6, 1992	ABC
3	22		September 18, 1992	July 2, 1993	ABC
4	14	7	June 1, 1994	July 20, 1994	ABC
4	14	7	September 6, 1995	November 10, 1995	Syndication

== Episodes ==
=== Season 1 (1991) ===
No. overall	No. in season	Title	Directed by	Written by	Original release date	Prod. code	Viewers (millions)
1	1	"The Mighty Megalosaurus"	William Dear	Michael Jacobs & Bob Young	April 26, 1991	D301	28.4
Earl tells Baby the events surrounding his birth. Fran has one wish in life, which is a new set of pots and pans with mesh screens for lids, said to be the better to keep dinner in the pot. Earl realizes that he can't afford to buy the simplest of pleasures for his family, which leads him to ask boss Richfield for a raise, with disastrous results. A chance meeting with the escaped "dinner" saves the day (and job) when dinner reappears as Earl's new supervisor at WESAYSO Development Corp.
2	2	"The Mating Dance"	Reza Badiyi	Michael Jacobs & Bob Young	May 3, 1991	D302	24.8
Earl shoulders household duties for a weekend, sending exhausted Fran to her mother's for a little rest and relaxation. When she returns to a frazzled Earl, singed baby and demolished household, Earl discovers that Fran's unhappiness does not stem from the kids, but rather from him. At Roy's suggestion, Earl takes a refresher course in the Mating Dance, attempting to once again woo and win his wife.
3	3	"Hurling Day"	Tom Trbovich	Rob Ulin	May 10, 1991	D303	22.4
Earl is excited to throw Ethyl into the tar pits on her 72nd birthday, an old dinosaur tradition. The tradition specifies that men have the honor (and pleasure) of throwing their mother-in-law off a cliff. The day before the hurling, however, Robbie decides that it is just a tradition and his grandmother should not be hurled.
4	4	"High Noon"	Tom Trbovich	Victor Fresco	May 17, 1991	D305	22.4
Earl is challenged to fight to the death by Gary, a 50' Dilophosaurus who took a fancy to Fran in the frozen food section of the supermarket. Earl must decide whether or not to fight for what belongs to him, or to follow the law of the jungle and run like nuts.
5	5	"The Howling"	Jay Dubin	Rob Ulin	May 24, 1991	D306	20.4
When male dinosaurs turn 15, they go through a rite-of-passage known as "The Howling", during which the youngsters join the adults on top of the mountain to howl at the new moon. Robbie does not see the point, however, and rebels. This sets off a chain of events, including the dissolution of Earl and Roy's friendship, which causes Robbie to understand that rituals that get dismissed as superstition are actually designed to protect the tribe. Robbie gains a new appreciation for being a dinosaur.

=== Season 2 (1991–1992) ===
No. overall	No. in season	Title	Directed by	Written by	Original release date	Prod. code	Viewers (millions)
6	1	"The Golden Child"	Tom Trbovich	Dava Savel	September 18, 1991	D310	19.6
After eating all of the sugary treats that they were in the fridge when no one is watching him, Baby bumps his head, and the bump grows into a golden horn. Earl is appalled, until he learns from the dinosaur druids that the appearance of a golden horned baby was foretold in The Book of Dinosaurs. Baby becomes a cult object and Earl is a celebrity by association. The horn eventually comes off, but Earl comes to appreciate the treasure that his baby is all by himself.
7	2	"Family Challenge"	Bruce Bilson	Tim Doyle	September 25, 1991	D311	18.9
Fran demands her family to spend more time together, and, in order to get their attention, she wrecks the TV. When a meteor crashes through the roof of their home breaking their other TV set, Earl leads the family to try their luck as game show participants, where the first prize is a new TV. Earl messes up on obscure areas of knowledge, but is humiliated when all of the questions focus on how well he knows his family, which is not as well as he thinks. They study their history, but by time they appear on the show, all of the categories have to do with the latest television events.
8	3	"I Never Ate for My Father"	Tom Trbovich	Rob Ulin	October 2, 1991	D309	20.4
Robbie refuses to join a Young Male Carnivores Association (YMCA) and considers becoming a herbivore. Earl is appalled and hauls Robbie off to hunt in the wilderness, to reinforce the carnivore ethic: the bigger eats the smaller. When Robbie is swallowed by an enormous swamp monster, Earl is forced to reconsider his philosophy. When Earl too is swallowed, the father and son continue their argument inside the belly of the beast. However, when recounting how he and his father argued, and how he wanted a better life for his family, Earl realizes that new ideas from the next generation can help a species evolve. Upon leaving the swamp monster's belly, both father and son reconcile, with Earl accepting Robbie's choice in lifestyle.
9	4	"Charlene's Tale"	Tom Trbovich	Dava Savel	October 9, 1991	D307	20.7
Charlene is despondent because she is the last girl in the eighth grade to grow a tail. Her outlook miraculously changes when her tail appears overnight, however. Earl's awareness of his little girl's budding womanhood drives him to distraction, but reassurance from Charlene that she will always be her father's little girl cheers him up.
10	5	"Endangered Species"	Jay Dubin	David A. Caplan & Brian LaPan	October 16, 1991	D308	20.2
It is Earl and Fran's 20th wedding anniversary, the Graptolite anniversary. Graptolites are the sweetest-tasting and most adorable little animals, but they are also quickly disappearing from the earth. Earl has acquired a pair, and everyone else wants them, particularly Richfield. Robbie befriends the creatures and finds they are the very last pair. Soon, father and son are at each other's throats over the fate of the Graptolites.
11	6	"Employee of the Month"	Reza Badiyi	David A. Caplan & Brian LaPan	October 23, 1991	D304	20.0
Richfield institutes an Employee Suggestion Box, which has Earl and Roy racking their brains in an effort to impress the boss. At Earl's suggestion, the employee coming up with the best suggestion each month will receive dinner with Richfield and their name on a plaque - with Earl named the first "Employee of the Month". Earl's big moment is somewhat tarnished, though, when Richfield does not show up for dinner.
12	7	"When Food Goes Bad"	Patrick Johnson	Story by : Kirk Thatcher; Teleplay by : Tim Doyle & Kirk Thatcher	October 30, 1991	D312	20.4
Charlene is left alone to babysit Baby Sinclair, who is teething, while Fran and Earl go out for a nice romantic dinner. Fran gives into temptation to call home, but no one answers; the children have been kidnapped by food that has been left in the refrigerator for too long and gone bad. Charlene must use her wits to foil the food before Fran and Earl get home.
13	8	"Career Opportunities"	Bruce Bilson	Richard Day	November 6, 1991	D314	21.7
Robbie is assigned Tree Pusher as his life's vocation by the all-powerful The Job Wizard. In the process of showing an unenthusiastic Robbie how wonderful a job Tree Pusher is, Earl comes to realize instead how pointless his own life actually is, and retires to bed, unable to move. When Robbie has to replace Earl at the worksite, he gets into trouble and Earl must rally to rescue his son.
14	9	"Unmarried...With Children"	Tom Trbovich	David A. Caplan & Brian LaPan	November 13, 1991	D315	20.5
Earl and Fran's marriage license expires. When Earl bungles the renewal test by displaying complete ignorance of the details of his marriage, Fran considers not picking up Earl's option. Earl is forced to move in with Roy, while the Sinclair's new next door neighbor, Monica – an Brontosaurus and the first divorced female in history – shows Fran that the single life has possibilities.
15	10	"How to Pick Up Girls"	Bruce Bilson	Andy Goodman	November 20, 1991	D316	20.9
Robbie hires his best friend Spike to teach him how to pick up a girl that he has a brutal crush on, but Spike's unique advice gets Robbie grounded; a situation that Robbie finds not nearly as unbearable as the discovery that Spike, having refined his flirtatious technique, is dating the girl of Robbie's dreams.
16	11	"Switched at Birth"	Tom Trbovich	Tim Doyle	November 27, 1991	D317	18.2
Planning for Baby's first birthday, the Sinclairs discover evidence that their baby may have been switched with another baby while still an egg. Earl is tantalized by the notion that there is a polite, well-behaved baby out there somewhere who might be his son. Fran is unwilling even to consider the possibility until she meets the other baby – who looks exactly like the Sinclair baby except he is green like Earl – and the other father shares certain personality traits with the Sinclair's baby.
17	12	"Happy Refrigerator Day"	Bruce Bilson	Victor Fresco	December 11, 1991	D318	20.2
The happiest holiday in Pangaea is approaching, and Earl overspends on presents for the family. When the traditional WESAYSO bonus fails to come through for Earl, the family is placed under financial threat. Any hope for a joyous holiday is dashed when their refrigerator is repossessed. With no food, no refrigerator, and no money, the family is forced to fall back on the spiritual side of the holiday.
18	13	"What 'Sexual Harris' Meant"	Tom Trbovich	David A. Caplan & Brian LaPan	December 18, 1991	D319	16.8
Monica begins working for Mr. Richfield where she first meets her supervisor Al "Sexual" Harris. Al "Sexual" Harris uses suggestive language, but Monica turns him down. Al "Sexual" Harris fires Monica, who in turn takes the company to court with charges of sexual harassment. This forces the courts to try to determine what exactly "Sexual Harris meant".
19	14	"Fran Live"	Tom Trbovich	Victor Fresco	January 8, 1992	D321	19.3
Fran calls a phone-in TV advice show with a suggestion for the host and ends up hosting the show herself. Fran's anecdotes over the air expose Earl to ridicule at work, however, and pressure builds for her to quit her job.
20	15	"Power Erupts"	Bruce Bilson	Andy Goodman	January 15, 1992	D322	19.9
As a science project for school, Robbie comes up with an idea for tapping the geothermal energy of volcanoes to heat the homes of all Pangaea. The idea is taken seriously by the government and Robbie seems to be a hero, except that his plan for free energy threatens the business interests of the WESAYSO Corporation, which sells energy for a profit. When WESAYSO puts the screws to Earl to squash his son's idea, Earl is put in conflict with Robbie.
21	16	"The Clip Show"	Jay Dubin	Story by : Andy Goodman; Teleplay by : Dava Savel & Rob Ulin	January 22, 1992	D313	17.7
Sir David Tushingham, a self-important paleontologist, attempts to shed light upon the mysterious world of the dinosaurs in a mock-documentary featuring clips from the first eleven episodes that proves the theories of modern science fall far short of the real world in which Earl and his family inhabited millions of years ago.
22	17	"A New Leaf"	Mark Brull	Rob Ulin	February 5, 1992	D320	19.1
Following a fierce argument with Earl, Robbie storms out of the house to meet Spike and discovers an appealing leaf that, when ingested, makes them both effusively happy. Upon returning home, Earl is surprised to find Robbie in such an elated state until he samples some of Robbie's leaves. Expecting to find father and son at war, Fran is puzzled when she discovers Earl and Robbie arm in arm. Suspicious of the tantalizing leaves, Fran exhibits cautious restraint and becomes increasingly concerned when her family happily decides to remain at home rather than go to work or school. Earl's lack of concern after discovering he has been fired forces Fran, who refuses to become co-dependent, to abscond from the house and leave a delirious Earl, Robbie and Charlene to hopelessly fend for themselves. Having run out of leaves, they are forced to recognize what they have become, but Spike tests their resolve when he uncovers fresh leaves. This leaves them with a choice of two things: their lives, or the plant. At the end of the show, Robbie gives a PSA announcement why drugs are bad and what happens to people when they take it.
23	18	"The Last Temptation of Ethyl"	Tom Trbovich	Dava Savel	February 12, 1992	D323	17.0
When Ethyl unexpectedly dies, she goes to the afterlife and finds out how beautiful it is. Before she can be reunited with her husband Louie, it is revealed that she is only unconscious and will wake up. Anxious to soon return to the afterlife, Ethyl goes on TV and tells the viewers how wonderful it is. Unfortunately for Ethyl, the afterlife has its own message for her as Grandpa Louie states that she must be appreciative with her life as a sample of what will happen to her is shown when he shows an afterlife where there are a lot of Earls. Special Guest Star: Buddy Hackett as the voice of Grandpa Louie Note: This episode features a parody recreation of Unsolved Mysteries called "Mysteries That Haven't Been Solved Yet" featuring Earl and Roy burying Ethyl.
24	19	"Nuts to War: Part 1"	Bruce Bilson	Steve Pepoon	February 19, 1992	D324	17.2
A petty territorial dispute between the two-legged dinosaurs and the four-leggers across the swamp regarding pistachios escalates into the first war ever to exist. Robbie is selected to go into the "Nuts to War" war. However, Fran is worried and scared to death that Robbie will be killed in the war, so she decides to let Earl and Roy go to the battlefield.
25	20	"Nuts to War: Part 2"	Bruce Bilson	Story by : Steve Pepoon; Teleplay by : David A. Caplan & Brian LaPan	February 26, 1992	D325	19.6
Continuing from the last episode Earl and Roy join Charlene as USO entertainers and rush to the front to retrieve Robbie because it looks like this "war thing" is getting a little bit out of hand. Earl tries to stop Robbie from going through with the war, but Robbie ignores his father's wishes. Later on, Howard Handupme unintentionally mentions that one of the two-legged dinosaurs was killed causing the Sinclairs to think that Robbie was a casualty. Because of this information getting out, the Chief Elder calls a ceasefire and meets with the leaders of the four-legged dinosaurs to work out a peace treaty. Robbie turns up alive as he mentioned that one of the newer recruits was killed.
26	21	"And the Winner Is..."	Tom Trbovich	Story by : Rob Ulin; Teleplay by : Rob Ulin & Tim Doyle	March 27, 1992	D328	21.6
When the Chief Elder dies of a heart attack in the process of naming Baby Sinclair (now "Aaah Aagh I'm Dying You Idiot Sinclair"), Earl becomes embroiled in an intense but unsurprisingly non-substantive campaign with B.P. Richfield for Chief Elder of Pangaea: first as Richfield's patsy, and later as a self-made, come-from-behind candidate bent on preventing a bleak homeland under what appears to be Richfield's imminent rule.
27	22	"Slave to Fashion"	Tom Trbovich	Dava Savel	April 3, 1992	D326	21.8
Feeling like a social outcast at school, Charlene begs her father for money to buy an expensive fur coat that none of the other girls have, and her grandmother ends up giving it to her. The coat indeed makes Charlene the envy of her friends, but unlike other status symbols, it talks, and begins to make demands that cause Charlene to become alienated from her family and friends, especially her best friend.
28	23	"Leader of the Pack"	Bruce Bilson	Kirk Thatcher	April 24, 1992	D327	19.0
Robbie is drafted as the leader of Spike's gang when the former leader disappears after a wild night with Robbie.
29	24	"WESAYSO Knows Best"	Bruce Bilson	Victor Fresco	May 8, 1992	D329	16.4
To improve its public image, the WESAYSO Corporation picks the perfect employee family to be featured in their company advertisement. Earl's dream comes true when his family is chosen, but WESAYSO feels Roy has more audience appeal. When the ad campaign is a hit, Earl moves out of his own house so Roy can move in. Roy soon learns that parental responsibility is more difficult than he thinks, however, and Earl realizes that his family and friend might not be successful without him.

=== Season 3 (1992–1993) ===
No. overall	No. in season	Title	Directed by	Written by	Original release date	Prod. code	Viewers (millions)
30	1	"Nature Calls"	Brian Henson	Andy Goodman & Kirk Thatcher	September 18, 1992	D331	18.7
Baby Sinclair runs away to the wilderness following Earl's unsuccessful attempts at civilizing him through toilet training to avoid changing his diapers.
31	2	"Baby Talk"	Bruce Bilson	Victor Fresco	October 2, 1992	D332	18.1
As Baby Sinclair's vocabulary grows dirtier after learning an offensive swear word, "smoo", on television, Earl's resolve grows stronger to return "family values" to the permissive television landscape that fostered his child's newfound vulgarity – at least, until his efforts inadvertently create a repressive governmental atmosphere responsive to the slightest complaint from the fellow citizens of Pangaea.
32	3	"Network Genius"	Tom Trbovich	Tim Doyle	October 16, 1992	D330	17.9
Earl becomes a network executive after being sent to the network as the average Joe to help pick the new series. However, when Earl's favorite shows lead to a slowdown in Pangaea's brain power, Earl may have to sacrifice his first great job to program a television schedule smarter than he is, in hope of saving what is rapidly becoming a dense dinosaur race.
33	4	"The Discovery"	Tom Trbovich	Andy Goodman	October 23, 1992	D333	16.8
Earl's discovery of a pristine world inhabited by cavemen is the mark he has been waiting to leave in the history books – until Robbie and Baby are kidnapped by the cavemen, intent on saving their land from the ruthless development of WESAYSO's "Sinclair City."
34	5	"Little Boy Boo"	Tom Trbovich	Kirk Thatcher	October 30, 1992	D339	17.7
In a special Halloween episode, Robbie is forced to baby-sit Baby. Although Baby succeeds in scaring his older brother, Robbie turns the tables and frightens Baby into submission by weaving a scary tale based on the wolfman fable using himself as the "Wereman", half dinosaur/half man. Includes a music video featuring Baby Sinclair.
35	6	"Germ Warfare"	Tom Trbovich	Peter Ocko & Adam Barr	November 6, 1992	D335	19.6
Earl makes the mistake of giving Baby a contaminated pacifier after it was stolen by mouse-like creatures and ended up in the chimney, Baby ends up ill. While medical science cannot cure Baby Sinclair of a dangerous viral infection, it can bankrupt Earl and Fran with expensive experimental drugs that fail to cure as promised (it at first makes Baby hallucinate that his family is out to hurt him). In desperation, the Sinclairs decide to follow the advice Ethyl has been promoting from the onset of the sickness – go see the traditional dinosaur witch doctor in the forest who invents penicillin.
36	7	"Hungry for Love"	Bruce Bilson	Lawrence H. Levy	November 13, 1992	D337	18.2
Love is in the air when Robbie meets Wendy, a cute young girl who just happens to be B.P. Richfield's daughter. Romance turns to danger however when it is rumored that Wendy is an eater who has made meals of her last four boyfriends upon Spike asking around about her. Robbie tries to avoid Wendy at all costs, but finally discovers that Richfield is the one who has been devouring Wendy's boyfriends.
37	8	"License to Parent"	Bruce Bilson	Andy Goodman	November 20, 1992	D338	20.1
After Earl is repeatedly ticketed by an overzealous officer Bettlhiem of the Parent Patrol for his poor relationship with Baby, he is sent to "Parents Ed", but fails miserably and is ordered not to parent for thirty days until he retakes the test. The ticketing officer is assigned to live with the Sinclairs' to observe Earl, making Fran the only authority figure in the house. A frustrated Earl points out Fran's parental inadequacies, causing her to lose her parental license too. Thankfully, their home returns to normal after Officer Bettlhiem "loses it" while trying to care for Robbie, Charlene, and Baby while Earl and Fran realize that good parenting comes from the heart, while the manual can be used as backup under certain circumstances.
38	9	"Charlene's Flat World"	Mark Brull	Tim Doyle	December 4, 1992	D340	18.3
When given a school assignment to come up with an original idea, a panicked Charlene is visited by a Muse who mistakes her for Nicolaus Copernicus and tells her that the Earth is round, not flat. After giving her report, Charlene is arrested by the Police Classroom Squad and tried for heresy. Robbie tries to help by appealing to Mr. Pulman, but he too is arrested. After being found guilty, a confident Charlene asks that she and Robbie be thrown off the edge of the flat world as sentence, knowing its impossibility and proving her right.
39	10	"Wilderness Weekend"	Tom Trbovich	Peter Ocko & Adam Barr	December 18, 1992	D341	17.3
Traditional gender roles are reversed when Earl, Robbie and Roy go to the forest for a male-bonding ritual known as "The Great Hunt", but end up discovering their feminine qualities. Back at home, Fran and her girlfriends get drunk, watch sports, and generally act like men.
40	11	"The Son Also Rises"	Tom Trbovich	David A. Caplan & Brian LaPan	January 8, 1993	D343	18.2
Fed up with Earl's continuous nagging, Robbie challenges him for the title of "Supreme Male" of the house. During their physical battle, Earl is caught off guard and Robbie emerges victorious. Robbie now assumes all of the responsibilities that accompany his new position: providing food and clothes for the family, maintain the house, pay the bills, etc. Earl, conversely, acts like a teenager since he has been relieved of his parental duties. When Robbie cannot bear the pressure any longer however, Fran steps in and forces Earl to become the head of the house again.
41	12	"Getting to Know You"	Mark Brull	David A. Caplan & Brian LaPan	January 15, 1993	D336	19.1
After Earl throws her a disastrous birthday party (as Fran wasn't feeling well), Charlene feels completely alienated from her whole family and signs up for a Species Exchange Program at school. She lives with a family of squawking, arrogant, annoying, bird-like creatures, and runs away. In exchange, the Sinclairs' get a teenaged version of this hideous species. Pushed to the edge, Baby eats the exchange student. Earl creates a fake kid and returns it to the family and then discovers that he has brought home a Charlene impostor. When the real Charlene returns, father and daughter make a pact to get to know one another better.
42	13	"Green Card"	Max Tash	Tim Doyle	January 29, 1993	D345	N/A
With the Pangaean economy suffering from a bad recession, Earl and Roy Hess lose their jobs. Meanwhile, the Chief Elder and the rest of the government blames its problems on all four-legged creatures in an effort to shift the blame away from them. Immediately, anti-four-legger legislation is passed, causing Monica to also be fired and lose her home. Roy marries Monica to allow her to stay on the right side of the swamp. Earl protests the marriage and breaks his friendship with Roy for colluding with the enemy. After a major accident in which several workers drown trying to build a swamp wall and some four-legged dinosaurs dove into the swamp to take part in the rescue effort to save the drowning workers, Earl repents for his bigoted ways after a four-legger saved his life and welcomes Roy back into his life. Public sentiment echoes Earl's attitude when the anti-four-legged laws are repealed by the Chief Elder, allowing Monica to resume her normal life without Roy.
43	14	"Out of the Frying Pan"	Bruce Bilson	Dava Savel	February 5, 1993	D342	21.4
Baby Sinclair becomes an overnight sensation by hawking frying pans in a commercial. Both he and Fran get caught up in the glamour of show business – riding in limos, going on talk shows, and generally developing "bad" attitudes while neglecting the rest of the family. Earl confronts Fran, who realizes her mistakes, retreats from the "business" and returns the Sinclair home back to normal.
44	15	"Steroids to Heaven"	Bruce Bilson	Mark Drop	February 12, 1993	D344	19.5
Deciding that girls date only jocks, Robbie decides to get "buff." Earl puts Robbie on an exercise program, but when that fails to bring the desired results, he tells Spike about his problem and asks why everyone else is so huge. Spike tells him it is because they eat thornoroids, insult-spewing creatures that instantaneously add lots of muscle, strength, and bulk to one's frame. Robbie asks where he can get some, but Spike says he should not or else. Robbie is determined to become huge and muscular, so he breaks into another student's locker and pops a couple. The next morning, Robbie wakes up to find that his muscles are huge. He tries them out and is strong enough to lift up a refrigerator. At school, he asks Caroline to go to the dance with him, and she agrees. He likes his new muscles so much that he breaks the locker open and eats several more thornoroids. Spike then comes and says that he has been eating them and a side effect of them is the growth of spikes on his skin, but Robbie does not care and eats even more, making his muscles grow to an even vaster size. Impressed with his new muscles, Robbie gets ready for the dance, but the thornoids also cause aggression, making him tear open the bathroom door and rip the sink out of the floor. Robbie learns his lesson after Caroline rejects his aggressive behavior and tells him she liked him the way he was before, with Spike then showing he's a true friend by sitting all night with Robbie until the effects of the thornoids wear off.
45	16	"Honey, I Miss the Kids"	Tom Trbovich	Richard Marcus	February 19, 1993	D346	19.5
Fran, feeling inadequate as a housewife, decides to get a volunteer job. Earl is opposed to the idea, but acquiesces when he takes Roy's advice to manipulate Fran into believing he is supportive of her by offering to work the night shift. Earl will stay home during the day with the kids, and hopefully Fran will miss the kids so much that she will quit her job. However, the plan backfires when Fran returns home and announces that she is going to work full-time. Horrified at the thought of staying home with the kids, Earl again takes Roy's advice to bond with his kids, believing Fran will get jealous at being replaced and return home. Again, Fran reacts the opposite way and causes Earl to inadvertently reveal his failed plans. Initially angry, Fran empathizes with Earl and agrees to a compromise that allows Earl to return to the day shift while she cuts back on her work hours.
46	17	"Swamp Music"	Tom Trbovich	Mark Drop	February 26, 1993	D350	16.6
Spike, who cannot stand Robbie's choice of music, decides to expose Robbie to an entirely different world and different style of music by taking him to the Swamp Shack. The swamp and this club are home to blue-hued mammals who have been restricted from contact with dinosaurs and lead difficult, depressing lives. Initially fearful of this different species, Robbie is completely taken with this new music and band members Howlin' Jay and his son, Sonny. Robbie plans to bring this new sound to the dinosaurs, who he believes will go crazy for it. Howlin' Jay is reluctant due to his previous contact with dinosaurs but Robbie and Sonny take a demo of their music to the head of Volcanic Records. The executive is not interested in the music but changes his mind after listening to the tape and signs Howlin' Jay and his band to a loophole-filled deal allowing the record company to steal the songs and style of the swamp and have them re-recorded by mainstream dinosaur singers and reap the profits. Robbie has to break the news to Howlin' Jay that they have been ripped off again by dinosaurs. Instead of being angry, Howlin' Jay decides to start his own record label created for and run by mammals.
47	18	"Dirty Dancin'"	Bruce Bilson	Story by : Rob Ulin; Teleplay by : Tim Doyle & Rob Ulin	March 12, 1993	D334	N/A
Having reached that awkward age where adolescent male dinosaurs find themselves breaking into the mating dance spontaneously and uncontrollably, Fran's open attempts at sexual education drive a confused and embarrassed Robbie to the Best Little Dancehouse in Pangaea, where he discovers what he really needs is not a quick "dancing lesson" with a stranger, but a talk with Earl.
48	19	"If I Were a Tree"	Bruce Bilson	Andy Goodman	April 18, 1993	D347	12.1
During story time for Baby, Ethyl reads him a tale about a dinosaur (Earl) who is pushing down trees when a thunderstorm approaches. Just as he is about to push down a large tree, lightning simultaneously strikes him and the tree causing them to exchange souls. The Tree is excited to learn it has become a dinosaur, able to move freely. In the Sinclair home, the Tree, as Earl, is thoughtful and kind, causing confusion among his family. Meanwhile, the real Earl is, besides himself being stuck in a Tree's body, with a pesky bird and animal living in him. The Tree, as Earl, confronts B.P. Richfield about the ruination of the Earth and Richfield commits him to a mental institution. This, coupled with the daily hardships of dinosaur life, causes the Tree to return to the forest. During this time, Earl is in a race to save the creature living in him because he is marked for clearing. Both realize they have to return to their original forms and unite in trying to save the forest.
49	20	"We Are Not Alone"	Jeff McCracken	Peter Ocko & Adam Barr	May 2, 1993	D348	11.9
Robbie tries to get his family to attend an environmental rally with him, but everyone declines. Robbie is especially upset with Earl, who prefers to watch his favorite TV reality show about alien sightings. At work, Mr. Richfield, in an effort to fool the environmentalists who named WESAYSO a top corporate polluter, orders Roy and Earl to take home barrels of toxic waste and bury them in the Sinclair's backyard. While digging, Earl and Roy are visited by an "alien" (Robbie) who tells Earl that what he is doing is wrong. The "alien" also tells him that he has been chosen to spread the word to other dinosaurs that they must respect and care for the environment or else the planet will be vaporized. Earl immediately changes his ways and sets out to rally the masses to help clean up the environment. He even badmouthes WESAYSO and quits his job to devote all of his energies to his new mission. Robbie tries to point out to Earl that what he has done is of real value but Earl will have none of it and returns to his job and watching TV.
50	21	"Charlene and Her Amazing Humans"	Bruce Bilson	Dava Savel	May 9, 1993	D351	N/A
Feeling ignored by her family, Charlene becomes an instant celebrity after winning her school talent show with three trained cavelings (a name given to young cavepeople) that she found in the forest. Charlene gets an agent and is booked on a top variety show. Consumed by her new status and pushed by her agent, Charlene employs inhuman tactics to get her cavelings to perform dangerous tricks. On show night, Charlene realizes the error of her ways and, feeling guilty, she refuses to go on with the show and gives an impassioned speech about respect and family. Charlene's speech prompts Earl and Fran to realize their error in ignoring their daughter as Charlene gives the cavelings back to their mother.
51	22	"The Clip Show II"	Tom Trbovich	David A. Caplan & Brian LaPan	July 2, 1993	D349	13.2
Scenes from various episodes are interspersed with pitches by paleontologist Sir David Tushingham that try to lure customers into the glamorous, high-paying world of paleontology by getting them to buy the Famous Paleontologists' Home Study Course. In true informercial style, there's a deal-a-dinosaur wheel and comic testimonials from satisfied customers.

=== Season 4 (1994–1995) ===
Season 4 was divided into two parts: A Summer series of new episodes written to serve as a coda to the series, culminating in Changing Nature, a definitive finale that sees the dinosaurs witness the dawn of the ice age; and a second, Fall series consisting of older episodes that had been preempted and never allowed to run. As a result, the last episodes aired take place chronologically before the series finale, where the extinction of the show's main characters had been implied. In syndication, networks tend to air the episodes in production code (ProdCode) order rather than the actual order used during the 1995 run, thus ending with ProdCode D365 ("Changing Nature") instead of ProdCode D353 ("Scent of a Reptile").

No. overall	No. in season	Title	Directed by	Written by	Original release date	Prod. code	Viewers (millions)
Part 1
52	1	"Monster Under the Bed"	Brian Henson	Peter Ocko & Adam Barr	June 1, 1994	D354	15.3
Baby complains of a monster under his bed, but the family does not believe him. One night while Fran and Earl are out, Charlene humors Baby by investigating his claim and is dragged into the monster's hole. Robbie and Baby try to rescue Charlene, but they, too, are kidnapped. Just as they are about to be eaten, Robbie learns that the monster is angry at having his home (hole) built upon by the Sinclair's house. The whole crisis is resolved after Baby suggests moving the house and the Sinclairs oblige. Special Guest Star: Michael McKean as the voice of Police Chief Parish
53	2	"Earl, Don't Be a Hero"	Mark Brull	David A. Caplan & Brian LaPan	June 8, 1994	D356	12.1
Earl's accidental exposure to toxic waste transforms him into "Captain Impressive", a mysterious super hero committed to fighting crime and righting wrongs. Earl also sees his chance to outshine Captain Action Figure, Baby's current hero, by using his newly acquired superpowers against the forces of evil – until B.P. Richfield discovers Earl's hidden talents. Determined to use "Captain Impressive" for WESAYSO's benefit, Richfield quickly changes Earl from superhero to super-huckster. At that moment, Earl decides to hang up his tights and retire from his career as a crime fighter. Special Guest Star: Michael McKean as the voice of Ed
54	3	"The Greatest Story Ever Sold"	Tom Trbovich	Peter Ocko & Adam Barr	June 22, 1994	D358	10.3
The Council of Elders is convened to determine answers to the Great Question Of Life, and the answer is found to be Potatoism. Soon it is "steak-and-potatoes" for Robbie and Earl, when Robbie rejects the elders' wisdom, Earl not finding any answers in the book to save Robbie, and the duo is sentenced to be burned as infidels. However, a gust of wind extinguishes the fire, and with it dies the people's belief in the message of The Great Potato. Special Guest Star: Tim Curry as the voice of the Chief Elder.
55	4	"Driving Miss Ethyl"	Jeff McCracken	Adam Barr & Tim Doyle & Jane Espenson & Peter Ocko	June 29, 1994	D364	10.6
Fran forces Earl to drive her mother, Ethyl, to her 60th-year high school reunion. During the drive, Earl and Ethyl's normal fighting and bickering ensue. However, when they get to the reunion, they quickly discover that every one of Ethyl's old classmates have died, and that she is the only one who is still technically alive. When Earl sees how sad Ethyl is, Earl comforts her and the two decide to become nicer and friendlier with each other, which Fran and the kids are surprised to see when they finally get home. Meanwhile, while Earl and Ethyl are gone, Fran tries gathering the rest of the family for a family portrait, and they end up at each other's throats. Special Guest Star: Michael McKean as the voice of Ansel, Glenn Shadix as the voice of a Monster
56	5	"Earl's Big Jackpot"	Mark Brull	Tim Doyle	July 6, 1994	D361	11.2
When Earl is injured on the job and asks for a few days off, B.P. Richfield refuses and fires him instead. Robbie and Fran trick Earl into suing the WESAYSO Corporation for his $800 medical expenses. After a brief trial, Earl is ecstatic at the jury's award of $800 million after the judge mishears Robbie. Earl begins to spend the money lavishly and behaves badly. Stung by the judgment and blaming Earl, Richfield announces massive layoffs and raises consumer prices. Earl does not see it that way and is happy with his new life, but finally, he is forced to give back the money in order to return things to normal when Mr. Richfield sues him back for allegedly injuring his neck in a car accident. Including a first appearance of Blarney the red Deinonychus but he will be back on "Into the Woods". Special Guest Star: Tim Curry as the voice of Winston
57	6	"The Terrible Twos"	Jeff McCracken	Tim Doyle	July 13, 1994	D357	11.3
Baby enters the "terrible twos" and his behavior becomes horrendous; he acts like a spoiled little brat, plays a mean trick on his older sister, Charlene, smashes a toy train that his older brother, Robbie, gives him, smashes the TV because a Pangean TV show called "Blarney" is on, and attacks his family while driving a toy car he got for his birthday. It even defies belief as it reaches the standards of Linda Blair in The Exorcist. Earl and Fran try to get help from a doctor, but he suggests that they wall him up inside a cave for the rest of the year, but Fran disapproves of that, so they later consult a dog and child trainer, but Baby bites Earl, drives his family out of the room and eats the sofa. Desperate times require desperate measures, and the Sinclairs enlist the aid of "The Babysitter", suggested by Ethyl, to exorcise Baby's demons. When neither the exorcist nor doctors can cure Baby, Robbie hatches a plan for the family to fool Baby into believing he is three. Special Guest Star: John Glover as the voice of The Babysitter, Michael McKean as the voice of Dr. Herder
58	7	"Changing Nature"	Tom Trbovich	Kirk Thatcher	July 20, 1994 (a series finale storyline, though other out of sequence unused episodes would later air in syndication)	D365	9.9
The family prepares to celebrate the return of the Bunch Beetles, who arrive back on Pangaea every May 14th to eat the rapidly growing Cider Poppies. This year, however, they fail to arrive, and it soon emerges that WESAYSO built a wax fruit factory on top of their mating ground and killed the species. Without the Bunch Beetles to eat them, the Cider Poppies quickly begin to overrun the continent. More concerned with bad publicity than any threat to the ecosystem, B.P. Richfield chooses Earl to take care of the problem. Earl, who is really eager to quickly get rid of the Cider Poppies instead of looking for a long-term solution, chooses to spray everywhere with defoliant. Although this clearly succeeds in getting rid of the Cider Poppies, it also manages to destroy all of the plant life on the entire planet. Deciding that rain is needed to bring back the plants, B.P Richfield decides to drop bombs in every volcano, with the reasoning that the clouds they produce will bring the rain. Instead, the volcanoes produce thick black clouds, blocking out the sun and plunging the planet into a long-lasting ice age. By the time Earl finally realizes the grave mistake his company made by tampering with nature and taking it for granted, it's already too late to reverse the changes. He apologizes to his family for his part in the world's destruction, but assumes that dinosaurs will not simply disappear. The Sinclairs agree that they will remain a family no matter what happens, as the house begins to be buried by snow on the outside. Special Guest Star: Michael McKean as the voice of Bryant
Part 2
59	8	"Georgie Must Die!"	Mark Brull	David A. Caplan & Brian LaPan	September 6, 1995 (in syndication)	D363	N/A
Baby is mesmerized by the latest annoying children's idol: Georgie, an orange Hippopotamus. This enrages Earl until one day he finally removes one of the tapes Baby is watching and breaks it into pieces, prompting a tantrum from Baby. To make up for this, Earl has to take Baby to Georgie, who is making a live appearance at the nearby mall. However, Earl refuses to do so upon seeing the long line of Georgie's fans, prompting another tantrum from Baby. Desperate to cheer up Baby, Earl dons a costume and imitates Georgie to stop Baby's cries. Unfortunately, this gets Earl arrested for copyright infringement by Georgie's people and is thrown in jail. While in jail, Earl is visited by Georgie himself, who reveals his intentions to assert his brand on the children and profit from the marketing and merchandising. Earl escapes with the help of Jean-Claude and Brigitte, members of the Parents' Resistance who see Georgie for what he truly is: a money-grabbing, tax-evading fraud. With help from Roy, Earl sneaks into Georgie's studio and ultimately exposes the evil hippo's intentions. Roy keeps the children entertained as "Uncle Roy" while Earl defeats Georgie who Roy claimed as Georgie's "evil twin". During the credits, it is reported by Howard Handupme on DNN that the fallout from the melee seen on last week's Georgie show has sparked a justice department investigation into the Georgie empire leading to the arrest of Georgie himself on the charges of racketeering and tax evasion. It was also mentioned by Handupme that Earl has been pardoned of all charges and given the key to the city by the Chief Elder who personally thanked Earl for in his words "giving that chuckling carpet bag the well-deserved shot in the chops". Earl then mentions to his family that there is no door that can fit the key he got. Special Guest Stars: Ed Asner as the voice of Georgie the Hippo (evil voice), Tim Curry as the voice of Jean-Claude
60	9	"Into The Woods"	Brian Henson	Mark Drop	September 20, 1995 (in syndication)	D352	N/A
Baby Sinclair is taken into the forest for the dinosaurs' traditional Wilderness Rite of Passage, which teaches the value of the family. When Earl, Robbie, and Roy get stuck in a tarpit, their only hope for survival is Baby. Special guest star: Michael McKean as the voice of Les, Steve Whitmire as the voice of Woody
61	10	"Variations on a Theme Park"	Jeff McCracken	Jane Espenson	November 6, 1995 (in syndication)	D359	N/A
The Sinclairs vacation at WESAYSO Land with its lovable mascot Moola the Cash-Cow. The family is engulfed in the usual horrors and frustrations associated with amusement parks: unbearably long lines, rides that are not working or are under construction, overpriced merchandise, food, hotels, etc. Miserable, the Sinclairs decide to leave, but discover they are trapped since they purchased a 14-day vacation package. Instead of returning to the park, the family stay in the hotel and bond. Much to their surprise, they find they actually enjoy each other's company.
62	11	"Life in the Faust Lane"	Tom Trbovich	Mark Drop	November 7, 1995 (in syndication)	D360	N/A
Earl sells his soul to the devil for a collectible mug that becomes more important to him than his job, family, or friends. Everyone is fed up with Earl and leaves him. Lonely, Earl realizes that people mean more to him than objects and he discovers a loophole that puts him out of the deal with the devil. Special Guest Star: Tim Curry as the voice of the devil and Michael McKean as the voice of Hank
63	12	"Working Girl"	Tom Trbovich	Rich Tabach	November 8, 1995 (in syndication)	D355	N/A
Under pressure from the government to hire women, B.P. Richfield hires the first female who walks through the door to be the new supervisor. It turns out to be Charlene. Earl, refusing to take his daughter seriously, takes advantage of his new boss, until Charlene asserts herself. Special Guest Star: Joe Flaherty as the voice of the Chief Elder, Michael McKean as the voice of the Inspector
64	13	"Earl & Pearl"	Tom Trbovich	Tim Doyle	November 9, 1995 (in syndication)	D362	N/A
When Earl's long-lost sister Pearl re-enters his life after twenty years, Earl is cold and distant. Pearl further alienates Earl when the kids take to her and her country-western singing lifestyle. Earl comes to accept his sister after she explains her reasons for leaving.
65	14	"Scent of a Reptile"	Tom Trbovich	Andy Goodman	November 10, 1995 (in syndication)	D353	N/A
Fran and Charlene are thrilled when Charlene gets her adult scent, which will attract her perfect mate. Charlene's euphoria turns to horror, however, when her match turns out to be not only the school janitor - but also just like Earl. Fearful that she will lead an ordinary domestic life like her mom, Charlene decides to go against tradition and change her scent as well as her life. Special Guest Star: Glenn Shadix as the voice of Ray
