= The Flintstones in Viva Rock Vegas =

2000 comedy film directed by Brian Levant

- Theatrical release poster by Drew Struzan
- Directed by: Brian Levant
- Written by: Deborah Kaplan; Harry Elfont; Jim Cash; Jack Epps Jr.
- Based on: The Flintstones by William Hanna; Joseph Barbera
- Produced by: Bruce Cohen
- Starring: Mark Addy; Stephen Baldwin; Kristen Johnston; Jane Krakowski; Thomas Gibson; Alan Cumming; Harvey Korman; Joan Collins
- Cinematography: Jamie Anderson
- Edited by: Kent Beyda
- Music by: David Newman
- Production companies: Hanna-Barbera Productions; Amblin Entertainment
- Distributed by: Universal Pictures (Note: The Universal logo at the beginning of the film reads "Univershell".)
- Release date: April 28, 2000
- Running time: 91 minutes
- Country: United States
- Language: English
- Budget: $83 million
- Box office: $59.5 million

The Flintstones in Viva Rock Vegas is a 2000 American romantic comedy film directed by Brian Levant, written by Jim Cash, Harry Elfont, Deborah Kaplan, and Jack Epps Jr., and is the standalone prequel to Levant's The Flintstones (1994), based on the 1960–1966 animated television series of the same name. The film was developed and produced without the involvement of Steven Spielberg, the executive producer of Levant's The Flintstones (1994). It is set before the events of both the series and the first film, showing how Fred and Barney meet Wilma and Betty. The title is a play on the Elvis Presley song, Viva Las Vegas, also used as the title of an MGM musical film.

With the exception of Irwin Keyes as Joe Rockhead, none of the original cast from the first film reprise their roles in this film. The film stars Mark Addy as Fred Flintstone, Stephen Baldwin as Barney Rubble, Kristen Johnston as Wilma Slaghoople, and Jane Krakowski as Betty O'Shale, replacing John Goodman, Rick Moranis, Elizabeth Perkins, and Rosie O'Donnell respectively. The supporting cast features Joan Collins, Thomas Gibson, Harvey Korman, and Alan Cumming as both The Great Gazoo and Mick Jagged, a parody of Mick Jagger. William Hanna and Joseph Barbera, who created the original cartoon series, make cameo appearances at the end of the film.

The Flintstones in Viva Rock Vegas was released by Universal Pictures on April 28, 2000. Like its predecessor, it received generally negative reviews, and grossed $59 million worldwide on a budget of $83 million.

== Plot ==
In prehistoric suburban Bedrock, young bachelors and best friends Fred Flintstone and Barney Rubble have recently qualified as crane operators at Slate & Company. Soon to be employed, they hope to score dates. The Great Gazoo, a small, green alien exiled to Earth by his species, offers them help, although only they can see him. Meanwhile, Wilma Slaghoople, the daughter of a wealthy military veteran, wants a normal life, though her controlling mother Pearl wants her to marry suave casino owner Chip Rockefeller. She runs away from home and meets waitress Betty O'Shale at the restaurant Bronto King in downtown Bedrock. With Wilma unable to pay for her meal, Betty assumes her to be "caveless" and offers to buy her lunch. Wilma moves into Betty's apartment and gets a job as a fellow waitress.

Smitten with the waitresses, the two men invite them to a carnival, with Fred dating Betty and Barney taking Wilma. However, the couples fail to bond until both men switch dates. At one game, Fred wins an egg that hatches into a dog-like baby dinosaur, which he names "Dino". Wilma invites her new friends home to a birthday party for her father, Colonel Slaghoople, where all are shocked by her wealth. Intending to propose, Fred changes his mind after meeting Chip, who mocks his low-level job at Slate & Company. Pearl despises the three new friends, but the Colonel, glad for Wilma's happiness, accepts them and privately gives Wilma a valuable pearl necklace that her great-grandmother once wore. After the boys humiliate themselves at dinner, Wilma, nevertheless, proclaims her pride and follows them out.

Chip congratulates Fred on attracting Wilma, apologizes for lampooning Fred's job, and invites the group to his Rock Vegas resort as an olive branch. However, unbeknownst to the group, Chip plots to ensure Fred gambles so Wilma dumps him, whereas Fred sees it as a chance to win big so he can impress Wilma with money like Chip's. Gangsters Big Rocko and Little Rocko visit Chip and his girlfriend Roxie to collect a sum of money that Chip owes their boss. Gazoo overhears Chip claiming his upcoming marriage to Wilma will allow him to access the Slaghoople fortune. Considering that the plan is creditable, the gangsters agree to suspend collections until after the wedding. When Barney tries to keep Fred from high-stakes poker, Chip sends Roxie to seduce and escort Barney to an all-you-can-eat buffet.

Chip keeps Fred gambling and he misses his dinner date with the others. Betty sees Barney wipe the cream off Roxie's chest, misinterpreting the gesture as a pass. Mick Jagged comforts Betty, and they go on a date. Wilma breaks up with Fred over not spending any time with her. Chip warns her of burglaries and arranges for Fred to lose everything before slipping Wilma's pearls into Fred's pocket and framing him for stealing them. Hotel security arrests Fred for robbery, but when Barney protests that Fred is incapable of robbery, Chip accuses Barney of being Fred's accomplice and also has him arrested. Believing Chip's lies, Wilma goes back to him.

Gazoo visits the men in prison, revealing that Chip is severely indebted to the mob and hopes to solve both his problems by framing Fred for the robbery and marrying Wilma to get his hands on the Slaghooples' money. Barney slips through the bars, steals the keys, and unlocks the cell. Disguised in drag as dancers, they accidentally run into Jagged's dressing room. Barney tells Betty he loves her, and they reconcile after the misunderstanding involving Roxie at the buffet is cleared up.

Fred plans to disguise himself as Jagged in an attempt to reconcile with Wilma. Meanwhile, in the audience, Chip proposes to an unimpressed Wilma. Fred then comes on stage disguised as Jagged and briefly sings "This Isn't Love" to Wilma, apologizing for his behavior earlier before proposing to her. Knowing she still loves Fred, Wilma happily accepts, rejecting Chip, and they marry in the Rock Vegas Chapel of Love. After the pastor proclaims them husband and wife, everyone sings "Meet the Flintstones". When Jagged sings "Viva Rock Vegas" at a party, Betty catches Wilma's tossed bouquet and kisses Barney. The newlyweds drive away with Dino and Gazoo to goodbye waves from their friends, family, and even a handcuffed Chip and Roxie.

== Cast ==
- Mark Addy as Fred Flintstone, a Bronto-crane operator at Slate & Company. He was played by John Goodman in the first film.
- Stephen Baldwin as Barney Rubble, a Bronto-crane operator and Fred's best friend and coworker. He was played by Rick Moranis in the first film.
- Kristen Johnston as Wilma Slaghoople, the heir to the Slaghoople fortune and Fred's love interest. She was played by Elizabeth Perkins in the first film.
- Jane Krakowski as Betty O'Shale, a waitress at Bronto King, Wilma's best friend, and Barney's love interest. She was played by Rosie O'Donnell in the first film.
- Thomas Gibson as Chip Rockefeller, a casino owner and Wilma's ex-boyfriend who tries to win her back.
- Alan Cumming as The Great Gazoo, an alien who befriends Fred and Barney.
  - Cumming also portrays Mick Jagged, the Stones' English lead singer.
- Harvey Korman as Colonel Slaghoople, Wilma's wealthy military veteran father, who suffers from post-traumatic stress. Korman previously voiced the Great Gazoo in the original television series and the Dictabird in the first film.
- Joan Collins as Pearl Slaghoople, Wilma's mother. She was played by Elizabeth Taylor in the first film.
- Alex Meneses as Roxie, Chip's girlfriend who assists in his plot.
- Tony Longo as Big Rocko, a tough gangster who seeks to collect the money that Chip owes his unnamed boss.
- Danny Woodburn as Little Rocko, a short gangster seeking to collect the money that Chip owes his unnamed boss.
- John Taylor as Keith Rockhard, the Stones' bassist.
- Irwin Keyes as Joe Rockhead, reprising his role from the first film.
- Taylor Negron as Gazaam and Gazing, aliens from Gazoo's race.
- Mel Blanc (archive footage, voice) as Puppy Dino; Blanc previously voiced Barney, Dino and numerous characters in the original series.
  - Mark Mangini provides additional vocal effects.
- William Hanna (special appearance) as himself
- Joseph Barbera (special appearance) as himself
- John Stephenson as the voice of the Showroom Announcer; Stephenson previously voiced a number of guest characters in the original series, most notably Mr. Slate and Count Rockula.
  - Stephenson also voices the Minister who marries Fred and Wilma.
- Rosie O'Donnell as the voice of the Octopus giving Wilma and Betty massages; O'Donnell previously portrayed Betty in the first film.
- John Cho as Parking valet
- Kristen Stewart as Ring Toss Girl
- Steve Schirripa as Croupier
- Cheryl Holdridge as Genvieve, a party guest of Wilma
- Jim Doughan as Dinosaur Confessor. Doughan previously portrayed a waiter in the first film.

=== Puppeteers ===
- David Barclay (lead)
- Kevin Carlson
- Tom Fisher
- Terri Hardin
- Bruce Lanoil
- Michelan Sisti
- Allan Trautman

== Production ==
After the financial success of the first film, Universal Pictures initially greenlit two sequels to The Flintstones to be filmed back to back in the vein of Back to the Future: Part II and Back to the Future Part III. John Goodman refused to reprise his role, out of fear of typecasting. He reportedly went up to Steven Spielberg and begged himself out of doing any sequels, saying "Please don't make me do any more of these."

Brian Levant then retooled the film into a prequel. Though there were never concrete plans for a sequel, Levant later mused that it might have followed the Flintstones going to the old west, which Levant compared to films by the Marx Brothers, the Three Stooges, and Buster Keaton. The film was also originally planned to be a full-blown musical, which Universal refused. Levant was still able to include three musical numbers in the film.

Korman, who played Wilma's father Colonel Slaghoople, voiced the Great Gazoo in the animated series and also voiced the Dictabird in the first film. Stephenson, who voiced both the Showroom announcer and the Minister, voiced Mr. Slate in the animated series. In addition to Goodman, Rick Moranis, Elizabeth Perkins, and Rosie O'Donnell, who played Barney, Wilma, and Betty respectively in the first film, also did not reprise their roles.

Alan Cumming was the first actor cast. He was initially only supposed to play Gazoo, but after performing as Mick Jagged for the table read, it was decided he would play both roles. The film was originally meant to be a sequel to the first film.

== Music ==
Ann-Margret, who had a guest appearance on the original animated series as the title character in "Ann-Margrock Presents", sings the theme song, a slightly rewritten version of Viva Las Vegas.

== Release ==
=== Box office ===
The Flintstones in Viva Rock Vegas opened theatrically on April 28, 2000, and earned $10,518,435 in its first weekend, ranking second to U-571's second weekend. The film ended its run on August 17, 2000, having grossed $35,268,275 domestically and $24,200,000 overseas for a worldwide total of $59,468,275. This was a disappointment compared to the first film's $358.5 million worldwide gross.

=== Critical response ===
On Rotten Tomatoes, The Flintstones in Viva Rock Vegas has a 26% score, based on 73 reviews, with an average rating of 4/10. The site's critical consensus states: "The prequel to the first full-length feature set in Bedrock, Viva Rock Vegas is a surprising improvement over The Flintstones. Aimed towards an audience of adults and children alike, critics feel Viva will appeal to a broad range of viewers." Metacritic reports a 27 out of 100 ratings, based on 26 reviews, indicating "generally unfavorable reviews". Audiences polled by CinemaScore gave the film an average grade of "B+" on an A+ to F scale, the same rating as its predecessor.

=== Accolades ===
The film was nominated for four Razzies at the 21st Golden Raspberry Awards:

- Worst Picture
- Worst Supporting Actor (Stephen Baldwin)
- Worst Supporting Actress (Joan Collins)
- Worst Remake or Sequel

At the 2000 Stinkers Bad Movie Awards, it won the award for Worst Resurrection of a TV Show. It also received seven nominations in total; its other nominations were for:

- Worst Supporting Actor (Stephen Baldwin)
- Worst Song ("Viva Rock Vegas" by Ann-Margret)
- Worst On-Screen Hairstyle (Stephen Baldwin)
- Worst Remake or Sequel
- The Remake or Sequel Nobody Was Clamoring For
- Most Unfunny Comic Relief (Alan Cumming as The Great Gazoo and Mick Jagged)

== See also ==
- List of films set in Las Vegas
