= Monkeybone =

2001 film

- Theatrical release poster
- Directed by: Henry Selick
- Written by: Sam Hamm
- Based on: Dark Town by Kaja Blackley
- Produced by: Michael Barnathan; Mark Radcliffe
- Starring: Brendan Fraser; Bridget Fonda; Chris Kattan; Giancarlo Esposito; Rose McGowan; Whoopi Goldberg
- Cinematography: Andrew Dunn
- Edited by: Jon Poll; Nicholas C. Smith; Mark Warner
- Music by: Anne Dudley
- Production company: 1492 Pictures
- Distributed by: 20th Century Fox
- Release date: February 23, 2001
- Running time: 93 minutes
- Country: United States
- Language: English
- Budget: $75 million
- Box office: $7.6 million

Monkeybone is a 2001 American dark fantasy comedy film directed by Henry Selick, written by Sam Hamm, produced by Michael Barnathan and Mark Radcliffe and executive produced by Chris Columbus, Selick and Hamm. Combining live action with mostly stop-motion animation and loosely based on Kaja Blackley's graphic novel Dark Town, the film stars Brendan Fraser, Bridget Fonda, Chris Kattan, Giancarlo Esposito, Rose McGowan, Whoopi Goldberg and John Turturro as the voice of the titular character. It tells the story of a cartoonist who falls into a coma, where he ends up in the otherworldly Down Town as he runs into his titular creation and tries to return to the living world while contending with an evil plot to supply Down Town with nightmares.

Theatrically released on February 23, 2001, by 20th Century Fox, the film was a box-office bomb and received generally negative critical reviews for its characters and humor, although there was some praise for the visuals. Selick later admitted his unhappiness with the final product and has since vowed to never make another live-action film again.

== Plot ==
Stuart "Stu" Miley is a disillusioned cartoonist whose comic strip series featuring a mischievous monkey named Monkeybone is becoming a media franchise at the pestering of his agent and friend, Herb. He plans on proposing to his girlfriend, Julie McElroy, a sleep institute worker who helped him deal with his nightmares by changing his drawing hand. One night, Stu falls into a coma following a car accident and his spirit is taken to Down Town, a surreal and carnival-themed limbo-like landscape populated by mythical beings and figments of its visitors' imaginations, including Monkeybone, who he resents until they discover that people can leave Down Town when they are given permission via an "Exit Pass" from a visiting Grim Reaper.

Stu is invited to a pajama party hosted by Hypnos, the God of Sleep and ruler of Down Town, who tells Stu that he has to steal an Exit Pass from his sister, Death, in order to awaken from his coma before the plug is pulled in accordance with a pact that he and his sister Kimmy made as children following their father's death. Stu and Monkeybone journey to Death's domain, disguised as one of her employees, and steal an Exit Pass while narrowly escaping a nightmare which Julie inflicts on Stu in an attempt to wake him by using "Oneirix", a chemical solution she created that causes nightmare inducement.

Back in Down Town, Monkeybone makes off with the Exit Pass, revealing that the theft was part of a plan orchestrated by Hypnos, and enters Stu's body. Monkeybone adjusts to Stu's life and plans to go ahead with the franchising. Meanwhile, Stu is imprisoned with other disillusioned figures throughout history. A visiting Hypnos reveals to Stu that he and Down Town's populace thrive on nightmares and made a deal with Monkeybone to spread the Oneirix amongst the living in exchange for him getting his creator's body to himself, since he is fed up with being a figment.

Monkeybone is ordered by Hypnos via a nightmare to stay on course and steals the Oneirix from the sleep institute, leaving a decoy in its place. While Monkeybone puts the chemical in farting Monkeybone dolls to be given out to the public at a charity banquet, Julie becomes wary of "Stu's" new behavior. In Down Town, Stu escapes with the help of Miss Kitty, a catgirl waitress whom he befriended, and confronts Death to convince her to send him back to the living world to stop Monkeybone. Death complies and gives Stu an hour to do so as she puts him in the body of an organ donor with a cervical fracture.

Stu makes it to the banquet as Monkeybone is about to propose to Julie, while Herb is exposed to the Oneirix in one of the dolls and starts hallucinating, causing him to streak in a panic when he believes his clothes are rebelling. Stu confesses his love to Julie while expressing his regrets of never getting a chance to propose to her. He then uses Monkeybone's origin characteristics to make him panic as they fight on a giant Monkeybone balloon that is shot down by a police officer, causing the duo to fall to their dooms.

As they fall back into Down Town, Stu and Monkeybone fight before being caught by a giant robot operated by Death, who places Monkeybone back in Stu's mind, claiming it is where he belongs. She then sends Stu back into his proper body so he can continue his work since she is a fan of it. Back in the living world, Stu and Julie reunite while a still-infected Herb emerges nearby and urges the audience to remove their clothes. The film ends with a traditionally animated sequence where the banquet's attendants reveal themselves to be monkeys in disguise.

== Cast ==
- Brendan Fraser as Stuart "Stu" Miley, a disillusioned cartoonist and the creator of the Monkeybone franchise.
  - Fraser additionally portrays Monkeybone when he is in Stu's body.
- Bridget Fonda as Doctor Julie McElroy, a sleep therapist and Stu's fiancé.
- Chris Kattan as an organ donor with a cervical fracture that Stu briefly possesses in the film's climax (credited as "Organ Donor Stu").
- Giancarlo Esposito as Hypnos, the malicious and satyr-like God of Sleep and ruler of Down Town.
- Rose McGowan as Miss Kitty, a catgirl employed as a waitress at Down Town's local bar called the Coma Bar whom Stu befriends.
- Whoopi Goldberg as Death, the ruler of the Land of Death and Hypnos' sister.
- Dave Foley as Herb, Stu's agent and friend.
- Megan Mullally as Kimmy Miley, Stu's sister.
- Lisa Zane as Medusa, an inhabitant of Down Town who performs at Hypnos' pajama party. An extended scene shows that the snakes that make up her hair are her backing vocalists.
- Pat Kilbane as a Burger God representative
- Sandra Thigpen as Alice, Julie's friend and co-worker.
- Lou Romano as the police officer who shoots down the Monkeybone balloon its namesake likeness and Stu fight on.
- Harper Roisman as Earl Biegler, an elderly visitor of Down Town who is allowed to return to the living world.
- Scott Workman as Arnold the Super Reaper, a partially-armored Reaper who is one of Death's minions and tries to catch Stu and Monkeybone.
- Mary Stein as Lulu, a woman in Down Town who is claimed at Death's domain. A deleted scene showed that she was taken from Hypnos' pajama party.
- Christopher Franciosa as a Reaper who takes Lulu
- Fred Pierce as a Reaper in Death's office
- Jon Bruno as Stephen King, one of Hypnos' prisoners in Down Town who was previously tricked into infiltrating Death's domain to steal an Exit Pass as Hypnos allowed his figment of Cujo to enter King's body. (Note: Stephen King is only credited as "Man in the Dungeon".)
- Owen Masterson as Jack the Ripper, one of Hypnos' prisoners in Down Town.
- Shawnee Free Jones as Lizzie Borden, one of Hypnos' prisoners in Down Town.
- Jen Sung Outerbridge as Attila the Hun, one of Hypnos' prisoners in Down Town.
- Ilia Volok as Grigori Rasputin, one of Hypnos' prisoners in Down Town.
- Claudette Mink as Typhoid Mary, one of Hypnos' prisoners in Down Town.
- Edgar Allan Poe IV as Edgar Allan Poe, one of Hypnos' prisoners in Down Town.
- Bob Odenkirk as a head surgeon
- Leon Laderach as a surgeon in a nightmare
- Veena Bidasha as the Statue Woman, a statue of a female on a mobile round stand who is an inhabitant of Down Town.
- Michael Anthony Jackson as the Bug Man, an inhabitant of Down Town who possesses the head of a male human and the body of an insect.
- Doug Jones as the Yeti, an inhabitant of Down Town who has a long nose and white and blue fur and employed at Down Town's local nightmare-showing movie theater.
- Arturo Gil as the rat-like guard of Down Town's local prison that works for Hypnos.
- Jody St. Michael as the Centaur, a namesake inhabitant of Down Town.
- Frit Fuller and Frat Fuller as the Three-Headed Devil, an inhabitant of Down Town depicted with a trio of heads and legs.
- Brian Steele as Jumbo, a Ganesha-like being employed as the piano player at the Coma Bar.
- Leif Tilden as the Cyclops, an inhabitant of Down Town with horns, a large head and arms and a smaller torso and legs.
- Tom Fisher as the Community Service Cigarette Sweeper, a camel-like inhabitant of Down Town.
- Joseph S. Griffo as the BBQ Pig, an anthropomorphic pig who is a barbecued pork vendor in Down Town.
- Kim Timbers-Patteri as the Wasp Woman, an insectoid inhabitant of Down Town that is often seen with Hypnos.
- Lisa Ebeyer as Betty the Bovine, an anthropomorphic cow who is a prize vendor in Down Town.
- Wayne Doba as the Scorpion, an inhabitant of Down Town with scorpion legs and tails surrounding his face.
- Mark Vinello as the Ass Backwards, a bizarre fish-like inhabitant of Down Town with a pair of noses, bird-like wings, a tongue-like structure beneath its jaw and reptilian legs.
- Nathan Stein as the Sea Monster, an inhabitant of Down Town that resembles a piscine humanoid emerging from the back of its giant and four-legged seahorse-like mount.
- Ed Holmes as the Buffalo Kachina, a bison-type Kachina that lives in Down Town.
- Erica Gudis, Melinda Miamor and Caroline A. Rice as the Party Chicks, a trio of bird-beaked women in Down Town.
- Mike Starr as Bull (uncredited in the closing credits (Note: Mike Starr's portrayal of Bull is directly credited by Selick in the director's commentary.)), a Texas Longhorn-type Minotaur with a Picasso art-styled face who is the Coma Bar's bartender.
- Thomas Haden Church as Death's unnamed assistant who reads her the names of new arrivals that have died and arrived in the Land of Death (uncredited in the closing credits (Note: Thomas Haden Church is directly credited by Selick in his commentary, claiming that "[Thomas] is a really good improviser".))

Henry Selick's arm is seen during the film's opening sequence.

=== Voices ===
- John Turturro as Monkeybone, a monkey who is Stu's raunchy and mischievous creation.
- Brendan Fraser as Stanley (uncredited), a character in the Monkeybone series.
- Ted Rooney as the Grim Reaper
- Roger L. Jackson as Arnold the Super Reaper
- Joe Ranft as the Streetsquashed Rabbit, a roadkill rabbit that lives in Down Town.
- Bruce Lanoil as the Streetsquashed Raccoon, a roadkill raccoon that lives in Down Town.
- Debi Durst as the Streetsquashed Snake, a roadkill snake that lives in Down Town.
- Phil Brotherton as Super Mansa, a dual-sided messenger on a wheeled goose living in Down Town who gives Stu an invitation to Hypnos' pajama party.
- Jym Dingler as the Community Service Cigarette Sweeper
- Leslie Hedger as the Ass Backwards
- Toby Gleason as the Buffalo Kachina
- Allan Trautman as the BBQ Pig
- Mike Mitchell as Miss Hudlapp, Stanley's teacher from the pilot for the Monkeybone animated miniseries.
- Lou Romano as a therapist that Stanley sees in the pilot for the Monkeybone animated miniseries.

=== Puppeteers ===
- Lee Armstrong
- Ernique Bilsland
- Julianne Buescher
- Robert A. Capwell
- Kevin Carlson
- Mike Elizalde
- Eric Fiedler
- Thom Floutz
- Loren Gitthens
- Michael L. Hammond as Reaper Performer
- Terri Hardin
- Hiroshi Ikeuchi
- Jim Kundig
- Leon Laderach
- Bruce Lanoil as Monkeybone (on-set puppeteer)
- Pons Maar
- Todd K. Minobe
- James Murray
- Bridget Oberlin
- Brian Roe
- Terry Sandin
- Mike P. Scanlan
- Wendy Schmidt
- Russell Shinkle
- Brian Sipe
- Michelan Sisti
- Dave Snyder
- Allan Trautman
- Todd Tucker
- Vincent A. Verdi
- John Weldy

== Production ==
The comic book Dark Town, on which Monkeybone is based, was written by Kaja Blackley, illustrated by Vanessa Chong, and published by Mad Monkey Press. The journey from comic to film was initiated by a fan of the comic and member of the San Francisco animation community (Tom "Bags" Sacchi/ChasingDragons Productions NYC) who, without Blackley's knowledge, passed a copy of Dark Town on to one of Selick's producers, Denise Rotina. Selick fell in love with the book and vigorously pursued the rights. In a letter to Kaja, he wrote: "I've never felt any project was closer to my sensibilities than this one." The initial intention was to stay true to the source material, which can be seen in early designs from Selick's company, Twitching Image. However, as the project developed, it eventually evolved into Monkeybone.

=== Casting ===
Initially, the role of Stu Miley was to be played by Ben Stiller. Stiller dropped out to be in Mystery Men and was replaced by Fraser.

=== Influences ===
Much of the film's art bears a strong resemblance to that of Mark Ryden—for example, the bust of Abraham Lincoln as "The Great Emancipator". Stu's pre-therapy painting is similar to Ryden's The Birth, and according to the credits, was painted by him for the film. The animation style and the themes of the opening sequence in which Stu first encounters Monkeybone are similar to the work of Swedish cartoonist Magnus Carlsson. The film's plot is influenced by the films Who Framed Roger Rabbit, Cool World and Beetlejuice. Many critics mark a similarity between Dark Town's design and Tim Burton's style. The film contains a large number of references to a parody religion called The Church of the SubGenius. In particular, the fictional fast-food chain "Burger God" was originally a SubGenius creation. Additionally, the repeated references to Yetis, and the scene in which Stu (whose body is possessed by Monkeybone) is struck in the head with a golf club by Hypnos in a dream sequence, also echo recurring themes in the Church of the SubGenius.

== Reception ==
=== Box office ===
Monkeybone was a failure at the box office; based on a budget of $75 million, the film grossed $5,411,999 domestically and $2,210,366 worldwide.

=== Critical response ===
Critical reception to the film was mostly negative. On Rotten Tomatoes, the film has an approval rating of 20% based on 114 reviews, with an average rating of 3.9/10. The site's critical consensus reads, "Though original and full of bizarre visuals, Monkeybone is too shapeless a movie, with unengaging characters and random situations that fail to build up laughs." On Metacritic, the film has a weighted average score of 40 out of 100, based on 28 critics, indicating "mixed or average reviews". Audiences polled by CinemaScore gave the film an average grade of "C" on an A+ to F scale.

Roger Ebert gave the film 1.5 stars out of 4, saying, "The movie labors hard, the special effects are admirable, no expense has been spared, and yet the movie never takes off; it's a bright idea the filmmakers were unable to breathe life into."

In a 2022 interview, Henry Selick said of the film's critical and commercial failure:

It certainly would have done better if they advertised it a little... I would still like to do a Director's Cut because there's a lot of cool stuff that was removed... my main lesson learned is, I don't really do well in the live-action universe... I love my world of stop-motion... I went down a slippery slope to make Monkeybone, but the film that came out it's not my vision of what the film could've been, and I just don't thrive in that.

=== Accolades ===
The stunt work of Joey Preston and Jay Caputo in Monkeybone was nominated for a Taurus Award for Best Work with a Vehicle. Jay Caputo was also nominated for Monkeybone in the Best High Work category for the hot-air balloon scene.

Whoopi Goldberg was nominated for a Stinker Award for Worst Supporting Actress for her performances in both this movie and Rat Race.

== See also ==
- Go motion
- List of biggest box office bombs
- List of stop motion films
