= The Country Bears =

2002 film by Peter Hastings

- Theatrical release poster
- Directed by: Peter Hastings
- Written by: Mark Perez
- Based on: Walt Disney's Country Bear Jamboree
- Produced by: Andrew Gunn; Jeffrey Chernov
- Starring: Christopher Walken; Daryl "Chill" Mitchell; Diedrich Bader; Alex Rocco; Haley Joel Osment
- Cinematography: C. Mitchell Amundsen
- Edited by: George Bowers; Seth Flaum
- Music by: Christopher Young
- Production company: Walt Disney Pictures
- Distributed by: Buena Vista Pictures Distribution
- Release date: July 26, 2002
- Running time: 88 minutes
- Country: United States
- Language: English
- Budget: $35 million
- Box office: $18 million

The Country Bears is a 2002 American musical road comedy film directed by Peter Hastings, produced by Walt Disney Pictures, and based on the Disney theme park attraction Country Bear Jamboree. The film stars Christopher Walken, Daryl Mitchell, Diedrich Bader (in a dual role), Alex Rocco, and Haley Joel Osment as the voice of Beary Barrington with the voice talents of Candy Ford, James Gammon, Brad Garrett, Toby Huss, Kevin Michael Richardson, and Stephen Root.

It was Disney's second theatrical film based on an attraction at one of its theme parks, and the third overall film based on an attraction following the television film Tower of Terror (1997) and the theatrically released Mission to Mars (2000). The film was released theatrically in the United States on July 26, 2002 by Buena Vista Pictures Distribution. It was a critical and commercial flop, grossing $18 million of its $35 million budget.

== Plot ==
The Country Bears, a country rock band consisting entirely of anthropomorphic bears, had disbanded in 1991 after years of popularity. 11 years later, Beary Barrington, a preteen bear adopted and raised by a human family, feels different. His adoptive parents tell him that they love him unconditionally and that differences lead everyone to their purposes. When his adoptive older brother, Dex, tells him the truth about his background, Beary runs away and ventures out to the Country Bear Hall, the Country Bears' former concert hall.

Beary learns from the caretaker Big Al and the band's manager Henry Dixon Taylor that Country Bear Hall is threatened with destruction by greedy banker Reed Thimple. After many attempts to save Country Bear Hall, Beary suggests that Henry hold a benefit concert and the duo sets out to reunite the group with the band's bus driver and drummer Roadie. Meanwhile, the Barringtons enlist police officers Cheets and Hamm to find Beary.

Beary and Henry first recruit Fred Bedderhead, the harmonica and electric bass player, who works as a security guard on the set of pop singer Krystal's latest music video. Henry needs promotion and Beary suggests the group's former promoter Rip Holland, whom Henry claimed had "stolen" the Country Bears. Henry phones Rip, who gladly agrees to promote the show. Fred mentions a talent show history where they defeated an armpit musician named Benny Bogswaggle, who flew into an angry meltdown and struck Zeb Zoober, the band's fiddler, with a wooden chair. Meanwhile, Thimple approaches Big Al and learns about the Country Bears' plan and about Holland promoting the show.

The bears then approach Zeb, who has spent years drinking honey and owes a $500 bar tab. Beary places a bet to let Zeb go with them by beating the house band in a playoff, in which Zeb starts his performance poorly, but wins after warming up. Meanwhile, Cheets and Hamm approach Big Al for directions to find Beary, and because of miscommunication, believe the bears have kidnapped Beary.

Tennessee O'Neal, the one-string guitar player, who is now a marriage counselor, is very reluctant to rejoin the band because he wants to reconcile with his ex-girlfriend Trixie St. Claire, the band's keyboard player. After being chased by Cheets and Hamm through a car wash, the Country Bears stop at a motel, where Trixie is performing. Tennessee sings a duet with her, and she comes with the band to their reunion.

The bears finally head out to find Ted Bedderhead, the lead vocalist, guitarist and Fred's older brother. They learn from Elton John that Ted, who appears very wealthy, is at a wedding at the local country club. After Ted has the other Country Bears members leave, a reluctant Fred finds Ted and, learning that he is only a wedding singer, knocks out him before dragging him onto the bus. Zeb claims Ted to be the reason for the band's disestablishment, but Ted claims that he held them together and says that the real problem was Zeb's drinking, Tennessee's emotional outbursts, and Fred's immaturity, but Beary reminds them that they claimed each other to be family in a People magazine. However, Ted still claims that it was meaningless publicity and tells him that he does not know anything about the real bears and that they are not a family. Beary then realizes the real meaning of family and returns home, where he is happily reunited.

The Country Bears read Beary's school essay about them and realize that he was right. Reconciling with Beary, Ted goes over to Beary's house, where he apologizes for taking his anger out on him and tells Beary how much he has helped them and they will only do the show with Beary. They learn from Roadie that Thimple kidnapped the rest of the bears and stole the bus. Thimple reveals that he is Benny Bogswaggle and sought vengeance on The Country Bears for stealing his chance at fame. Beary, his family, and Ted track down and rescue the band, and they head to the concert together.

Once there, they discover that Thimple paid Rip not to promote the show. Big Al suddenly arrives and reveals, to everyone's surprise, that he promoted the show himself, and everyone is in a different parking lot. A crowd of people rushes in, and Thimple is driven out of the building while vowing that his feud is not over. The money raised from the concert is enough to save the hall and the Country Bears perform with Beary as a new member of the band.

== Cast ==
=== Live action ===
- Christopher Walken as Reed Thimple, a banker who plots to destroy the Country Bear Hall. He is actually an armpit musician named Benny Bogswaggle who harbors ill will towards the Country Bears after losing a talent competition to them long ago.
  - Michael Lawrence Morgan as Young Benny Bogswaggle
- Stephen Tobolowsky as Norbert Barrington, Beary's honorable and good-natured adoptive father.
- Daryl "Chill" Mitchell as Officer Hamm, an inept police officer.
- M.C. Gainey as Roadie, the bus driver for the Country Bears who also doubles as the band's drummer.
- Diedrich Bader as Officer Cheets, an inept police officer who wears a fake mustache.
- Alex Rocco as Rip Holland, the former promoter of the Country Bears.
- Meagen Fay as Allison Barrington, Beary's excitable, yet easily worried adoptive mother.
- Eli Marienthal as Dexter "Dex" Barrington, Beary's adoptive older brother.
- Jennifer Paige as a Waitress
- Jess Harnell as a Long-Haired Dude, one of the Bears' fans who was later seen with Dex in the audience at the end of the film.
- Paul Rugg as a TV reporter who reports on Beary's apparent "kidnapping".

Cameos

- Krystal as Herself, she was seen filming a music video.
- Don Henley as Himself, he appears in the documentaries about the Country Bears.
- John Hiatt as Himself, he appears in the documentaries about the Country Bears.
- Denzel Whitaker as Wyclef Jean, he appears in the documentaries about the Country Bears.
- Sir Elton John as Himself, he is mistaken as Ted's gardener by the other Country Bears and has allowed Ted to bunk with him and later appears in a documentary about the Country Bears.
- Queen Latifah as Herself, she appears in the documentaries about the Country Bears.
  - Latifah also plays "Cha Cha", the manager of the Swarming Hive Honey Bar restaurant.
- Willie Nelson as Himself, he appears in the documentaries about the Country Bears.
- Bonnie Raitt as Herself, she appears in the documentaries about the Country Bears.
- Brian Setzer as Himself, he appears in the documentaries about the Country Bears.
  - Setzer also plays the lead in the house band that Zeb duels against.
- Don Was as Himself, he appears in the documentaries about the Country Bears.
- Xzibit as Himself, he appears in the documentaries about the Country Bears.

=== Voice cast ===
- Haley Joel Osment as Beary Barrington, an optimistic bear cub who idolizes the Country Bears.
  - Elizabeth Daily as Beary Barrington (singing voice)
- Diedrich Bader as Ted Bedderhead, the lead vocalist and guitarist of the Country Bears, and Fred's older brother who became a wedding singer ever since the Country Bears broke up.
  - John Hiatt as Ted Bedderhead (singing voice)
- Candy Ford as Trixie St. Claire, the keyboardist and Tennessee's girlfriend who broke up with him following the Country Bears' break-up to date a wealthy panda for a brief time and worked as a singer at a motel. She later rekindles her relationship with Tennessee upon the Country Bears getting back together.
  - Bonnie Raitt as Trixie St. Claire (singing voice)
- James Gammon as Big Al, the sluggish and elderly property caretaker for the Country Bear Hall who is protective of the grass in front of the Country Bear Hall.
- Brad Garrett as Fred Bedderhead, the harmonica player and bassist of the band, and Ted's younger brother, who worked as a security guard.
- Toby Huss as Tennessee O'Neal, the sensitivie one-string guitar player of the band who worked as a marriage counselor ever since the Country Bears broke up.
  - Don Henley as Tennessee O'Neal (singing voice)
- Kevin Michael Richardson as Henry Dixon Taylor, the MC and manager of the Country Bears.
- Stephen Root as Zeb Zoober, the naive fiddle player who owed money to Cha Cha following the Country Bears' break-up.

=== Puppeteers ===
- Alice Dinnean as Beary Barrington (facial assistant)
  - Misty Rosas as Beary Barrington (in-suit performer)
- Michelan Sisti as Ted Bedderhead (facial assistant)
  - Brian La Rosa as Ted Bedderhead (in-suit performer)
- Terri Hardin as Trixie St. Claire (facial assistant)
  - Denise Cheshire as Trixie St. Claire (in-suit performer)
- Terri Hardin as Big Al (facial assistant)
  - John Alexander as Big Al (in-suit performer)
- Allan Trautman as Fred Bedderhead (facial assistant)
  - Kaepan Shaw as Fred Bedderhead (in-suit performer)
- Julianne Buescher as Tennessee O'Neal (facial assistant)
  - Jody St. Michael as Tennessee O'Neal (in-suit performer)
- Bruce Lanoil as Henry Dixon Taylor (facial assistant)
  - Tom Fisher as Henry Dixon Taylor (in-suit performer)
- John Kennedy as Zeb Zoober (facial assistant)
  - Tony Sabin Prince as Zeb Zoober (in-suit performer)

Some of the puppeteers made cameos in the film:

- Buescher, St. Michael, and Hardin were seen at the Swarming Hive Honey Bar where Buescher played a waitress and St. Michael is seen as a patron with a tattoo of Tennessee on his arm (which was painted on him by Buescher).
- La Rosa and his wife Bess were seen as patrons at the hotel bar where Trixie was performing.

== Production ==
Development began when Disney VP of Production Brigham Taylor took his family to Disneyland and decided the show would make a good movie. Many within the company were skeptical of the concept, but Buena Vista Motion Pictures Group president Nina Jacobson was sold on the concept and immediately pushed the film into production with the blessing of then-Disney chairman Peter Schneider. The movie was fast-tracked into production, both because of its low cost and to have releasable product on hand in the event of a possible writers' strike.

The animatronic bear suits used in the film were created by Jim Henson's Creature Shop.

Filming took place from March 15, 2001, to August 21, 2001. It was filmed in Franklin, Tennessee as well as various locations in California. The film was also the last film role for Daryl Mitchell before he became a paraplegic from a motorcycle accident on November 10, 2001, eight months before the film was released theatrically.

== Soundtrack ==
The Country Bears

Soundtrack album by Various artists
- Released: July 23, 2002
- Genre: Soundtrack
- Label: Walt Disney Records

The original music was composed by Christopher Young, and the songs were written by Brian Setzer, John Hiatt, Jimmy Tittle, Krystal Harris and Bela Fleck as well as Elton John.

No.	Title	Performers	Length
1.	"Let It Ride"	John Hiatt	3:16
2.	"Where Nobody Knows My Name"	John Hiatt	4:18
3.	"Can Love Stand the Test"	Don Henley and Bonnie Raitt	3:41
4.	"The Kid in You"	Krystal Harris	3:24
5.	"I'm Only In It for the Honey"	Stephen Root and Brian Setzer	2:51
6.	"Kick it Into Gear"	Jennifer Paige	2:33
7.	"Straight to the Heart of Love"	John Hiatt	4:40
8.	"Bear Mountain Hop"	Bela Fleck	1:56
9.	"Just the Goin'"	John Hiatt	1:59
10.	"Where Nobody Knows My Name (Reprise)"	E. G. Daily	1:52
11.	"So You Want to Be a Rock 'n' Roll Star"	The Byrds	2:06
12.	"Friends"	Elton John	2:25
13.	"Bearly Home (Score)"	Christopher Young	2:43
14.	"Nylon Hymn (Score)"	Christopher Young	3:41

== Release ==
=== Home media ===
The film was released on VHS and DVD on December 17, 2002. The film was filmed in 1.85:1 widescreen. All copies present the film in 1.33:1 fullscreen. This DVD release is THX certified, featuring a music video, an audio commentary, a documentary and other bonus materials.

== Reception ==
=== Box office ===
Budgeted at US$35 million, The Country Bears only made $5.3 million in its opening weekend, ranking in sixth place behind Austin Powers in Goldmember, Road to Perdition, Stuart Little 2, Men in Black II and K-19: The Widowmaker. It grossed $16,990,825 in the US and an additional $1,021,272 overseas. The film was released theatrically in the United States on July 26, 2002.

=== Critical response ===
Reviews for The Country Bears were generally negative. On review aggregator Rotten Tomatoes, the film received a rating of 29% based on 85 reviews, with an average rating of 4.5/10. The site's critic consensus states: "Despite all the celebrities on hand, this spin-off from a theme park attraction still feels tired and hokey." On Metacritic, the film has a weighted average score of 37 out of 100, based on 21 critics, which indicates "generally unfavorable reviews". Audiences polled by CinemaScore gave the film an average grade of "A-" on an A+ to F scale.

A. O. Scott of The New York Times gave the film a score of two out of five, explaining that "the plot combines The Blues Brothers and Almost Famous (but with bears, and a G rating), with an excruciating dollop of Disney sentimentality mixed in for good measure." Film critic Roger Ebert gave the film a two out of four stars and said, "the formidable technical skills in The Country Bears must not be allowed to distract from the film's terminal inanity." Rob Blackwelder of SPLICEDwire gave it a one-and-a-half out of four rating, calling it "an outdated, Chuck E. Cheese-quality Disneyland attraction...turn it into a trite, cliche-packed embarrassment of a feature film." Emma Cochrane of Empire gave the film a two out of five stars and said, "Too American, too country, too much like a slick, band extension cash-in, Country Bears hovers between cult video hit and utter rubbish, never being compellingly either."

Christopher Walken was nominated for a Golden Raspberry Award for Worst Supporting Actor for his performance in the film, but lost to Hayden Christensen for Star Wars: Episode II – Attack of the Clones.

== Cancelled sequel ==
Prior to the film's release, a sequel was announced to be in development. However, it was never produced.
