= Theodore Rex (film) =

1996 American buddy cop film

- Canadian video poster
- Directed by: Jonathan Betuel
- Written by: Jonathan Betuel
- Produced by: Richard Gilbert Abramson; Sue Baden-Powell
- Starring: Whoopi Goldberg; Armin Mueller-Stahl; Juliet Landau; Richard Roundtree
- Cinematography: David Tattersall
- Edited by: Steve Mirkovich; Rick Shaine
- Music by: Robert Folk
- Production companies: New Line Cinema; J&M Entertainment; Shooting Star Entertainment
- Distributed by: New Line Cinema
- Release date: July 2, 1996
- Running time: 92 minutes
- Country: United States
- Language: English
- Budget: $33.5 million

Theodore Rex, also known as T. Rex, is a 1996 buddy cop science-fiction comedy film written and directed by Jonathan Betuel and starring Whoopi Goldberg. Though originally intended for theatrical release, the film went direct-to-video, and consequently became the most expensive direct-to-video film ever made at the time of its release.

The film was reviewed poorly, and saw Whoopi Goldberg being nominated for Worst Actress at the 1996 Golden Raspberry Awards. It is the first direct-to-video movie to receive any sort of Razzie nomination.

== Plot ==
In an alternate futuristic society where humans and dinosaurs co-exist, a tough police detective named Katie Coltrane (Whoopi Goldberg) is paired with a Tyrannosaurus named Theodore Rex (George Newbern) to find the killer of dinosaurs and other prehistoric animals, leading them to a ruthless billionaire bent on killing off humankind by creating a new ice age. This is explained in the first 10 seconds by scrolling text.

The film opens on a black and white scene, a dark villain, Mr. Edge (Stephen McHattie), is chasing down someone in the "carnival graveyard". Upon locating the dinosaur, he releases a rainbow butterfly that explodes on their face.

Teddy then wakes up in his room with his pet dog, Zippy, nearby. Using his phone he calls up the police department, explaining he had a bad feeling. He is informed of the murder we just witnessed as a dream. Teddy is told he doesn't need to be involved as a "public relationist". Teddy doesn't take this into consideration as he says he'll be by shortly.

The scene then swaps to the second protagonist, Katie Coltrane. She is "busting" a moving body snatching ring that is in the back of a truck. She and her partner successfully steal the body back but the victim is not in their database.

Teddy is now at the crime scene, explaining to officer that dinosaurs "feel" for each other, explaining his "weird feelings" about the dinosaur who was murdered. These feelings are not further explained, but it is shown that they have some sort of psychic link.

Teddy heads to a party dinner held by Elizar Kane (Armin Mueller-Stahl) where he can speak with the police commissioner. Coltrane is forced to work with Teddy by Commissioner Lynch (Richard Roundtree) at the behest of Summers. Summers is secretly working with Kane to bring the end of the world into order and stop the two police officers from solving the crime. He believes Teddy is too stupid, and Coltrane is too old to keep pace with the energetic Teddy.

It is then explained because every single dinosaur was hand made by Dr. Shade and Kane, they are able to identify the body through the clone database. The victim's name is revealed to be Oliver Rex, married with Molly Rex. The movie repeatedly mentions cloning being a common practice, not just with the dinosaurs but with other humanoid species. It is also mentioned that dinosaurs aren't typically on the receiving end of crime, and in fact perpetuate crime. This and many other conversations held in the span of the next ten minuets of film heavily imply a social hierarchy system in which there are negative race relations between the reintroduced humanoid dinosaurs and their human counterparts.

Teddy bring Coltrane to a special dinosaur club named "The Extinct Species Club" where they drink water and the air is not cleaned like the rest of the city. Dinos call humans "soft skins" and Teddy has a conversation with Coltrane about interspecies relations. She is hit on repeatedly by a dino at the bar.

They head outback to talk with Molly Rex, who reveals that Oliver was not her husband, but in fact her roommate. Molly invites both detectives to the funeral for Oliver being held the next day.

== Cast ==
=== Live action ===
- Whoopi Goldberg as Katie Coltrane
- Armin Mueller-Stahl as Elizar Kane
- Juliet Landau as Dr. Veronica Shade
- Bud Cort as Spinner
- Stephen McHattie as Edge
- Richard Roundtree as Commissioner Lynch
- Jack Riley as Alaric
- Joe Dallesandro as Rogan
- Peter Mackenzie as Alex Summers
- Calvin Scott as Smithersaurus

=== Voice cast ===
- George Newbern as Theodore Rex
- Carol Kane as Molly Rex
- Hayward O. Coleman as Oliver Rex / Tina The Waitress
- Jan Rabson as Tina Rex
- Billy Bowles, Rodger Bumpass, Jennifer Darling, Denise Dowse, Bill Farmer, Anne Lockhart, Sherry Lynn, Mickie McGowan, Patrick Pinney, and Philip Proctor as Additional voices

=== Puppeteers ===
- Kevin Carlson as Ankylosaurus Dad
- Charles Chiodo as Guy In The Bag
- Edward Chiodo as Caterpillar
- Steven Chiodo as Guy In The Bag
- Tom Fisher as Ankylosaurus
- Terri Hardin as Molly Rex (face performance)
- Bruce Lanoil as Theodore Rex (face performance) / Oliver Rex (face performance)
- Pons Maar as Theodore Rex (in-suit performer)
- James Murray as Tina The Waitress
- Tony Sabin Prince as Molly Rex (in-suit performer)
- Dwight Robers as Guy In The Bag
- Paul Salamoff as Various Dinosaurs
- Michelan Sisti as Various Dinosaurs
- Jack Tate as Various Dinosaurs

== Production ==
The lead character Katie was originally a white male with Kurt Russell considered for the role.

== Reception ==
Theodore Rex was poorly reviewed by critics and audiences. On the review aggregator website Rotten Tomatoes, 0% of 5 critics' reviews are positive, with an average rating of 1.7/10. Variety magazine gave the film a negative review, saying, "This is one T. rex that won’t be spared the tar pits." William Thomas of Empire magazine gave the film a one out of five stars and said, "Steer Clear".

In a 2015 interview with the Brazilian newspaper Folha de S.Paulo, Goldberg stated that this is the only film she regrets ever having done: "Don't ask me why I did it, I didn't want to", she said. Goldberg also said it made "no sense to anybody to like it".

== Goldberg lawsuit ==
Though Whoopi Goldberg had made an oral agreement to star in the film in October 1992, she attempted to back out. Abramson filed a US$20 million lawsuit against Goldberg, which was settled quickly. Goldberg agreed to star in the film for $7 million, $2 million more than the amount originally agreed upon.

One of the attorneys on the case described this as being similar to the legal battle of Kim Basinger when she backed out of the film Boxing Helena.

== Distribution ==
The film was originally intended for theatrical release in North America during Christmas 1995, but a glut of competition as well as a rush on post production work for the effects heavy film led to New Line Cinema delaying release. They subsequently intended to release it to coincide with Goldberg's hosting stint at the Academy Awards the following year, but ultimately decided that it was in their best interests to release the film direct-to-video. This decision came as a result of failed test marketing in Las Vegas, Memphis, Portland, Maine and Providence. The film's $33.5 million budget made it the most expensive direct-to-video release at that time.

The international distributors to whom New Line had pre-sold the rights to the film adopted a different release strategy by distributing theatrically in every country except the United States and Italy.

== See also ==
- List of films featuring dinosaurs
