= Changing Nature =

- Dinosaurs episode
- The Sinclair family during the start of the Ice Age.
- Episode no.: Season 4 Episode 7
- Directed by: Tom Trbovich
- Written by: Kirk R. Thatcher
- Original air date: July 20, 1994

Guest appearances
- Joyce Kurtz as Katy; Michael McKean as Bryant; Thom Sharp as Bert

Episode chronology
← Previous "Terrible Twos"	Next → "Scent of a Reptile"

"Changing Nature" is the seventh episode of the fourth season of the American television sitcom Dinosaurs. It first aired on ABC in the United States on July 20, 1994. The episode had an unexpectedly dark, somber tone that surprised its audience, and is considered by many to be one of the darkest episodes in the show's history. It was intended to be the series finale, as all the characters will start dying soon due to the famine and cold of the newly arrived Ice Age, caused by the greed of the WESAYSO corporation. However, this was mooted when an additional seven, out of sequence, unused episodes that were produced before "Changing Nature" were aired in syndication.

== Plot ==
The Sinclair family is celebrating the upcoming arrival of the Bunch Beetles, a species of insect who come to Pangaea annually to eat all the Cider Poppies which tend to grow excessively around spring. However, after the countdown, the Beetles do not return, to the confusion of everyone. Four days later without the Bunch Beetles, the Cider Poppies have grown out of control and are overtaking Pangaea.

As the Sinclairs and Earl's best friend Roy try to deal with the situation by trimming down the Cider Poppies, one of the Bunch Beetles named Stan unexpectedly arrives at the Sinclairs' house. He explains that he became lost on his way to the mating ground in a swamp, but he needs to get there now since Bunch Beetles have a short lifespan. Charlene volunteers to help Stan, but when they get to the swamp, they discover that the WESAYSO corporation has built a wax fruit factory called FruitCo over the mating ground's swamp. They also learn from one of the factory workers that the other Bunch Beetles had arrived at the factory, but were sprayed with insecticide by workers, thus causing the entire species to become extinct and making Stan the last of his kind.

Charlene reports the extinction of the Bunch Beetles, stating that it was caused by WESAYSO's construction of FruitCo and that WESAYSO is responsible for the Cider Poppy crisis. Earl takes over the interview and tries to defend WESAYSO's actions by claiming that it was in the name of progress. Meanwhile, Earl's boss B.P. Richfield watches the interview from his trailer after getting a call from his superior Mr. Getty, knowing that it spells trouble for WESAYSO's public relations. After hearing Earl's comments defending WESAYSO, Richfield decides to have Earl run a special WESAYSO task force to fix the problem.

When Earl and Roy are interviewed about the task force, they explain that they are going to spray the Cider Poppies with defoliant and assure reporters that it is safe. However, Robbie questions Earl about spraying the continent with poison and asks if there is a safer alternative. Charlene suggests that they trim back the Cider Poppies and try to live with them for a while until nature restores the balance, but Earl refuses, claiming it will take too long. The defoliant is sprayed, which gets rid of the Cider Poppies. The next day, it is revealed that not only are all the cider poppies gone, but all plant life on Pangaea has been killed too, resulting in a famine.

At Mr. Richfield's trailer, he, Earl, and Roy try to figure out how to revive the plants; Mr. Richfield comes up with a plan to bring back the plants by making it rain. To do so, they need clouds, which he thinks come from volcanoes (which actually produce smoke). Bombs are dropped into volcanoes all around the world, which create giant black clouds that cover the entire planet. Howard Handupme reports that the clouds are blocking off the sun and causing global temperatures to drop. Earl tries to stay positive, claiming that the sun will come out and melt the snow. Howard reports that due to the thickness of the clouds, it will be tens of thousands of years before the sun shines over Pangaea again, thus beginning the Ice Age. Mr. Richfield, ignorant of the apocalypse, claims that the cold snap is a godsend because everyone is flocking to stores buying WESAYSO products to keep warm.

Later, Earl apologizes to Stan for WESAYSO destroying his mating grounds and causing the extinction of the Bunch Beetles. Then he apologizes to his assembled family for his unintentional part in WESAYSO bringing about the end of the world due to his misplaced faith in progress and technology and his disrespect for nature. An ominous silence falls as the Sinclairs look out of the window in uncertainty while the snow from the volcanic winter buries their home along with FruitCo.

During the credits, the Sinclair home is seen during the start of the Ice Age.

== Reception ==
=== Response ===
Stuart Pankin, the voice of Earl, stated that the ending "was a simplistic and heartfelt social comment, yet it was very powerful" with "subtlety" being a defining aspect.

The television series creators decided to make this finale as a way of ending the series as they knew the show would be canceled when they created season 4. Michael Jacobs said, "We certainly wanted to make the episode to be educational to the audience", and as people knew dinosaurs were no longer alive, "the show would end by completing the metaphor and showing that extinction". Ted Harbert, president of ABC, expressed discomfort at the ending in a telephone call but allowed it to go forward.

Pankin said, "Everybody was at first shocked, but I think it was more of a reaction to the show ending". Pankin stated that the audience "understood the creativity in the final episode, and they were sad at the predicament we presented in the story". He did not remember a significant number of audience members being angry about the ending. In 2018 Jacobs said that the episode would have trended on social media had it been released that year.

Noel Murray of The A.V. Club stated that the episode "delivered as blunt an environmental message as any major network TV broadcast since The Lorax".

Timothy Donohoo of CBR stated that "The show's climate-change-oriented ending is also more topical than ever, as concerns over the opposite continue to bring into question humanity's carbon footprint". Donohoo also stated that "Dinosaurs became TV's most-shocking finale precisely because it opted not for some moderately funny ending joke, but to subvert all expectations by advancing an important message through the protagonists' house, and their world at large, being engulfed in a fatal freeze".

=== Awards and nominations ===
Year	Award	Category	Title	Result
1995	Environmental Media Awards	TV Comedy	Episode: "Changing Nature"	Won
