= Jason Willinger =

American actor (born 1972)

- Born: February 2, 1972 (age 54)
- Occupation: Actor
- Years active: 1991–present

Jason Willinger (born February 2, 1972) is an American actor, who is known for providing the voice of Robbie Sinclair in the television sitcom Dinosaurs. He also provided additional voices for the film A Goofy Movie.

Willinger has also co-starred in the 1992 film Zebrahead and guest-starred in the television sitcoms Cybill and Champs. In 2006, Willinger was the narrator for the reality television series Everest: Beyond the Limit and in Cesar 911.

== Filmography ==
Year	Title	Role	Notes
1991–1994	Dinosaurs	Robbie Sinclair	Voice
1992	Zebrahead	Bobby	
1995	A Goofy Movie	Additional voices	Voice
1995	Cybill	Willy	
1996	Champs	Rick	
2001	Chasing the Sun	Guest appearance	Voice; TV Documentary
2002	TV Tales	Narrator	Voice
2006–2009	Everest: Beyond the Limit	Narrator	Voice
2014–present	Cesar 911	Narrator	Voice
2016	Munich'72 and Beyond	Narrator	Voice; Documentary
