= Pons Maar =

American actor (born 1951)

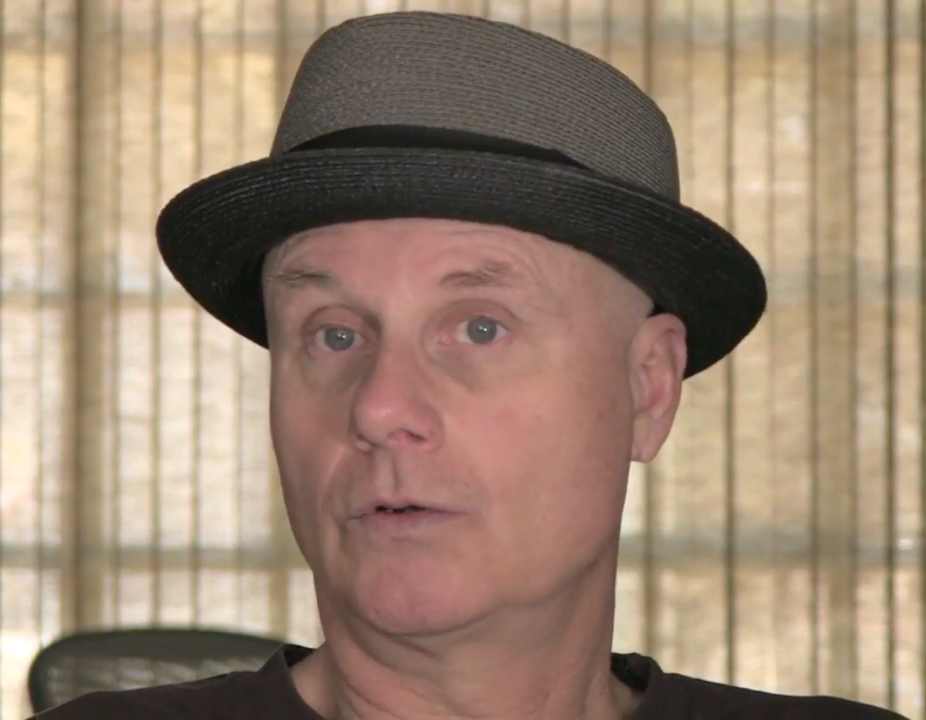
- Maar in 2011
- Born: August 4, 1951 (age 74); Pensacola, Florida, U.S.
- Occupations: Actor; puppeteer; artist; filmmaker
- Years active: 1982–present

Pons Maar (born August 4, 1951) is an American actor, puppeteer, artist and filmmaker.

== Career ==
His first feature film as an actor was Return to Oz (1985), in which he played the lead Wheeler; he also worked behind the scenes as a performance co-ordinator. His work on Return to Oz led to roles in other fantasy films, including The Golden Child (1986) and Masters of the Universe (1987).

Maar performed as the voice and body model for the Noid in the popular Domino's Pizza commercials of the 1980s.

Maar also worked as a performer for the entire 65-episode run of the television series Dinosaurs and co-starred in the film Theodore Rex (1995).

Recently, he served for two years as co-head of the puppeteer committee for the Screen Actors Guild (SAG).

== Filmography ==
=== Film ===
- Citizen: I'm Not Losing My Mind, I'm Giving It Away (1982)
- Alice Underground (1984) – The Mock Turtle
- Return to Oz (1985) – Lead Wheeler, Nome Messenger (voice), Nurse Wilson's assistant #1
- The Golden Child (1986) – Fu
- Masters of the Universe (1987) – Saurod
- Dead Heat (1988) – Pool Zombie
- The Blob (1988) – Theatre Manager
- The American Scream (1988) – Ben Benziger
- Michael Jackson's Moonwalker (1988) – The Noid (cameo appearance, "Speed Demon" segment)
- Theodore Rex (1995) – Theodore Rex (in-suit performer)
- Monkeybone (2001) – Lead puppeteer (uncredited)
- The Job (2008) – Mr. Mann
- Remembering Return to Oz (2018) – Himself

=== Television ===
- Straight Up (1988) – Heroin
- The Simple Life (1998) – Barry the Dinosaur
- Dinosaurs (1991–1994) – Roy Hess (in-suit performer), Fran Sinclair (in-suit performer; occasionally), Ansel (in-suit performer), Brigitte (in-suit performer), Chef (in-suit performer), Dr. Fricus (in-suit performer), Bert (in-suit performer), various characters
- Don't Eat the Neighbours (2001–2002) – Puppeteer

=== Commercials ===
- Domino's Pizza – Noid (voice)

== Production work ==
- Return to Oz (1985) (Mime movement arranger)
- Raisins Sold Out: The California Raisins II (1990) (Dancer)
- Theodore Rex (1995) (Character movement coordinator)
- George of the Jungle (1997) (Puppeteer) (uncredited)
- Species II (1998) (Creature motion supervisor)
- Phantoms (1998) (Puppet coordinator)
- Can of Worms (1999) (Puppeteer)
- Blues Brothers 2000 (1998) (Project supervisor)
- Beer Money (2001) (Additional puppeteer) (uncredited)
- Buffy the Vampire Slayer (2002) (Puppeteer) (uncredited)
- Don't Eat the Neighbours (2001–2002) (Puppeteer performance coordinator and casting)
- Team America: World Police (Puppeteer) (uncredited)
- The Job (2008) (Director, writer and editor)
- Fantastic (2015) (Cinematographer)
