= Terri Hardin =

American puppeteer

Terri Hardin Jackson
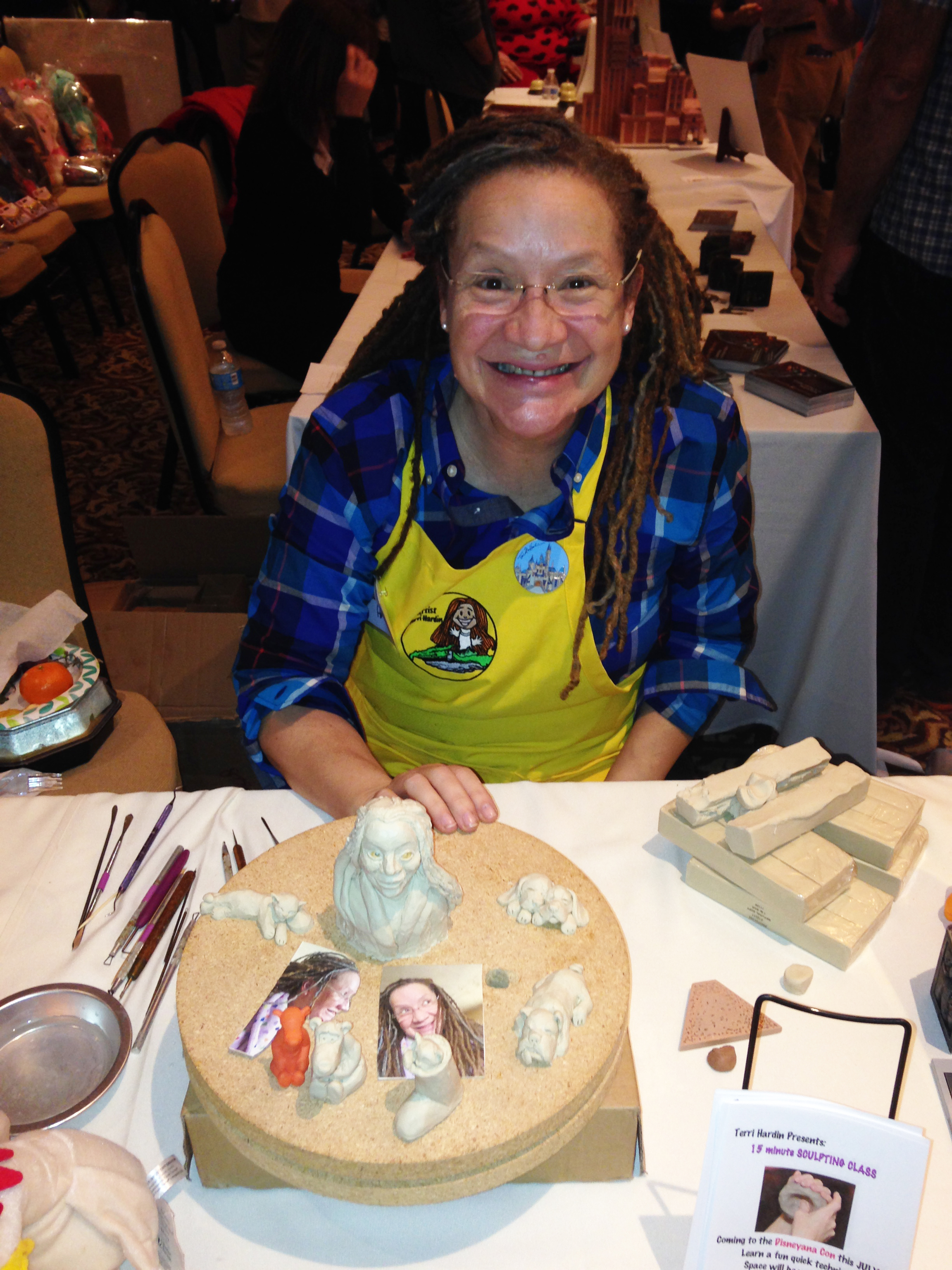
- Terri Hardin at Disneyana February 2016
- Born: June 21, 1957 (age 69); Pasadena, California, U.S.
- Occupations: Puppeteer, artist, imagineer
- Years active: 1976–present

Terri Hardin Jackson (born June 21, 1957) is an American puppeteer, artist, and former Disney imagineer.

Her first Hollywood job came during her college years in which she built the stillsuits for the film version of Dune and acted as a stunt double for Sean Young. A job on the Columbia Pictures Ghostbusters followed in which she played both of the demon dogs at the "Temple of Zuul" and served as a puppeteer for both the Stay-Puft Marshmallow Man and the ghost librarian seen at the opening of the film.

Hardin was hired by Disney Studios in 1987 during her time working with Universal Studios Hollywood as a sculptor creating "walk-around" character costumes. She helped design the Big Thunder Mountain Railroad and La Tanière du Dragon (The Dragon's Lair) attractions at Disneyland Park Paris.

Hardin later worked for Disney's sculpting team, where she contributed to the Splash Mountain attractions and to Jim Henson's Muppet*Vision 3D. She has also created sculptures Disney collectables and for Mattel, Nickelodeon and Applause.

Hardin worked for The Jim Henson Company for over 30 years, performing in Dinosaurs, The Flintstones, The Indian in the Cupboard and The Country Bears.

She is known for being the number one Star Wars fan in the news media. When the first Star Wars film was released in 1977, Hardin went to see the movie and loved it. She saw it a total of 66 times before theater employees caught her sneaking in wearing different disguises each time. With every viewing of the film, she would sketch the characters and she would write down all the names she could when the credits rolled. Channel 7 News interviewed her and used a clip of her saying that she had seen the film 100 times. By the end of its run, Hardin had seen the film 180 times. Because of her media coverage as the No. 1 fan, she ended up in the George Lucas biography, Skywalking: The Life and Films of George Lucas. She is mentioned on page 3. In 2015, the book A Galaxy All Their Own was published with Hardin on the cover and had over two pages dedicated to her inside.

== Walt Disney Imagineering ==
Walt Disney Imagineering credits:

- Star Tours - When the attraction first opened, the seats were made out of a foam-type material over which were cloth covers. If a guest became ill while on the attraction, a Cast Member would pull off the cover and take it out for cleaning. Meanwhile, a new cover was put on the seat. The foam would sometimes absorb the liquids into it before the cover could be removed and replaced. It was not very clean. Hardin was brand new to Imagineering at the time when Disney asked her to make a "vomit seat." She sculpted a seat that could fit buttocks but was shaped to "gather" the liquids that might end up on the seat. And, it had to be made out of non-absorbent material. This was Hardin's first project in Imagineering.
- Splash Mountain - The model sculpt for the Br'er Fox on Splash Mountain in three Disney parks. The Br'er Rabbit log figurehead and the log itself on Splash Mountain in Magic Kingdom and Tokyo Disneyland. In Tokyo Disneyland's Splash Mountain, she designed the look of the main drop. The Tokyo Splash Mountain project had fallen behind schedule, so Hardin was brought on. She created a new technique that could get the job done 10 times faster than before. So, she was given the task of designing the main drop. Consequently, Hardin helped them meet the deadline.
- Captain EO - The puppeteering for Idee and Odee, known as The Geex, in the 3D Disneyland and Epcot film Captain EO. When the Supreme Leader, played by Anjelica Huston, was supposed to have been lifted into the air, Hardin stood in as her stunt double. She was also the puppeteer for Hooter's trunk.
- Muppet*Vision 3D - In Jim Henson's Muppet*Vision 3D, she was the puppeteer for the It's a Small World dolls in the ensemble at the end of the film. That means there was more than one puppeteer huddled down underneath the characters. When the animatronic penguins were installed in the orchestral section up front, they needed someone to do the puppeteering for them. Hardin did the movements for them, and the movements were recorded and then used for playback during the show.
- La Tanière du Dragon - In 1987, she completely headed up a project, which was surprising to her because it did not happen often to women, when she worked on "The Dragon's Lair" in Disneyland Park Paris. She was the sole Imagineer who created it.
- Big Thunder Mountain Railroad - She also worked on designing Big Thunder Mountain Railroad in Disneyland Park Paris.
- Pan Galactic Pizza Port - In 1989, Pan Galactic Pizza Port in Tokyo Disneyland had animatronic puppets above the order queue that would talk and perform a show. Hardin was the one who puppeteered their movements. The theme was that the restaurant was built around a giant pizza-making machine, and Tony Solaroni was in charge of making the machine run.
- The version of Star Tours in Tokyo Disneyland needed its own Admiral Ackbar for a 20-minute loop video that would play in the queue. The Ackbar puppet was created by Hardin and Lynette Eklund, and was puppeteered by both of them as well. Hardin studied Japanese and was able to break down the dialogue so they could properly give Ackbar his facial expressions and movement.
- Body Wars - Epcot had an attraction called Body Wars. It was a motion simulation attraction, much like Star Tours, that opened in 1989 and starred Elisabeth Shue. The plot of the attraction was to shrink guests down and send them into the human body via the bloodstream. Hardin was responsible for making and puppeteering blood vessels and other body parts.
- In 2003, the first prototype interactive meet-and-greet Mickey Mouse was created and presented to Roy E. Disney for approval. This Mickey Mouse had a moving mouth, blinking eyes, and was able to talk. Hardin controlled the face and mouth with remote controls that were connected to and carried around in a trunk. In 2010, a functioning Mickey Mouse that could talk and blink appeared in shows and parades.
- The Twilight Zone Tower of Terror - The Imagineers had to pitch the idea and then get it approved before it could be put into production. They needed a photo to show off their new idea. So they created a life-sized model of the elevator car that the guests would sit in. Hardin was brought in and sat in the car for the promo photo.
- Journey Into Imagination - The Journey Into Imagination was a pavilion in EPCOT that opened in 1982. Hardin had auditioned for the role of puppeteering and voicing Figment for the 1983 attraction. She ended up holding the spot of 3rd runner-up as the role was given to Billy Barty. As of 2002, the role has been performed by Dave Goelz.

== Filmography ==
- King Kong (1976) - Extra in the crowd
- The Muppet Movie (1979) - Additional Muppet Performer
- Oral Roberts Celebration (1981) - Puppeteer for the Fudge Family; Arleen Fudge and was the hands for Grandma Fudge while she was knitting on camera.
- Ghostbusters (1984) - One of the puppeteers for the librarian and Zuul's demon dog. She was the one who showed up in the refrigerator. For that scene, Hardin was in the demon dog suit. She was also one of the puppeteers for the demon dog on the sofa. When the Ghostbusters meet Gozer, Hardin was in one of the dog suits off to the side. She puppeteered the face of the Stay Puft Marshmallow Man.
- Dune (1984) - Costume Designer along with Mark Siegel and was Sean Young's stunt double.
- Popples (short) (1986) - Popples puppeteer; this was a live-action, 22-minute, made-for-television movie based on the animated series of the same name to promote the new Popples backpacks.
- Captain EO (short) (1986) - Puppeteer for Idee and Odee, known as The Geex, and was also the puppeteer for Hooter's trunk. When the Supreme Leader, played by Anjelica Huston, was supposed to have been lifted into the air, Hardin stood in as her stunt double.
- The Wickedest Witch (1989) - She was part of the ensemble to puppeteer the dragons. There was a part in the film when the witch, Rue McClanahan, turns one of the dragons to stone. Hardin sculpted the "stone" dragon.
- Dinosaurs (1991-1994) - Puppeteer for Baby Sinclair's arms, Heather Worthington, Lingo, and sometimes Mindy. She would sometimes voice extra characters, like the food in the refrigerator and other background characters, and was once Mindy. Baby Sinclair took three puppeteers to work, one for the arms (Hardin), one for the eyes (John Kennedy), and one for the mouth and speaking (Kevin Clash).
- Muppet*Vision 3D (short) (1991) - the puppeteer for the It's a Small World dolls.
- Renegade (1992-1997) - Voice of the parrot in The Maltese Indian.
- The Flintstones (1994) - The puppeteer of Dino's hands and tongue and was also the one controlling the dinosaur that Fred rode at work.
- Muppet Classic Theater (1994) - Additional Muppet Performer / Voice.
- The Puzzle Place (1994-1998) - Puppeteer for Jody Silver in 11 episodes and Kyle O'connor in one episode.
- Theodore Rex (1995) - Puppeteer for Molly Rex.
- The Indian in the Cupboard (1995) - Puppeteer for the Indian. She puppeteered all the long-shot interactive scenes with him as a 5” stick puppet, but not the up-close shots with the actor. It was decided to use CG (computer graphics) to fill it all in, thus replacing her scenes. There was one brief moment that was left in the final film. It was when Omri took the teepee from his desk to try something out by putting it in the cupboard. Hardin was inside the dresser doing the puppeteer work and made him turn toward Omri. There were also some moments when she puppeteered the pet rat.
- Muppets Tonight (1996) - Additional Muppet Performer.
- Mars Attacks! (1996) - Special Effects Crew; created the dove of peace that was blasted out of the sky, the presidential parakeets, and the dog skeletons.
- DNA (1997) - Special effects crew; sculpted bones that were used to create the creature in the film.
- Wild America (1997) - Puppeteer for the bears and snakes. When Jonathan Taylor Thomas came face to face with the grizzly bear, Hardin puppeteered the fake bear.
- Men In Black (1997) - Puppeteer for The Twins.
- The Relic (1997) - She created the giant ground sloth skeleton and a second version of it that was burnable.
- Jungle 2 Jungle (1997) - She created the drugged cat that Tim Allen shot with the blowgun. She sculpted the face, built the body, and then covered it with fur. It was for the special effects studio KNB EFX Group.
- Spawn (1997) - Costuming - She created the fat suit for Clown, which was worn by John Leguizamo.
- Lost on Earth (1997) - Puppeteer and voice for Angela.
- The Eighteenth Angel (1997) - Special Effects Crew; sculpted the cat ears.
- Days of Our Lives (1965–present) - Puppeteer for a fake human head.
- Bruno (2000) - Also known as The Dress Code. Sculpt of an angel boy.
- The Flintstones in Viva Rock Vegas (2000) - Puppeteer.
- The Vampire Hunters Club (short) (2001) - Assistant Editor.
- Monkeybone (2001) - Puppeteer and voice actress for Betty the Bovine.
- The Country Bears (2002) - Puppeteer for Big Al and Trixie St. Clair.
- Men In Black II (2002) - Puppeteer for Sharkhead and The Worms
- The Low Budget Time Machine (2003) - Art Director, Special Effects Crew; created the hat William Sanderson wore, and was a Party goer.
- Team America: World Police (2004) - Puppeteer for the Samuel L. Jackson marionette in F.A.G. She also dabbed Gary Johnston's eyes with a tissue when he was crying.
- Boxes (short) (2005) - Host / Associate Producer.
- Store (2006) - Self / Associate Producer.
- In Somebody's Company (short) (2007) - Self.
- Food Network Challenge (2010) - Self-Judge.
- Zach and Myhre (short) (2016) - Costume designer.
- Dizney Coast to Coast (2017) - Self.
- Cleanin' Up the Town: Remembering Ghostbusters (2019) - Self.
- That Halloween Podcast (2020) - Self.
- Artists Amidst Covid 19 and Black Lives Matter (2020) - Self.
- Outrageous Pumpkins (2019-2022) - Self-Judge (9 episodes).

== Commercials ==
- Foster Farms - Hardin designed and built the Foster Imposter Chickens for the Foster Farms commercials, and is the puppeteer for the passenger chicken, which is the smaller of the two. She started filming them in 1993 and has completed about 40 commercials so far. Rick Lazzarini designs all of the new chickens, including the walking ones, for recent commercials.
- McDonald's - McDonald's came out with new battered Chicken McNuggets and started making commercials with the new McNuggets. Hardin created the McNugget puppets and puppeteered them from 1982 to 1986. They are called stick puppets. There were so many commercials made with them that it is unknown exactly which commercials she worked on.
- Nissin Noodle Cups - Going back to the early 1990s, the Jim Henson Workshop did a series of commercials for Nissin Noodle Cups. Hardin was the puppeteer for the face of the caveman's son. The face was radio-controlled.

== Personal life ==
Terri married Lindsey Jackson, son of sports commentator Keith Jackson, on January 4, 2000.
