= Bruce Lanoil =

American puppeteer

- Occupations: Puppeteer, voice actor
- Years active: 1986–present

Bruce Lanoil is an American puppeteer and voice actor who works for The Jim Henson Company and for The Walt Disney Company. He frequently works with puppeteer David Alan Barclay.

== Career ==
Lanoil has worked as a puppeteer in various films and television shows since 1986. He performed the Cat in the Hat and Fox in Socks in the first season of The Wubbulous World of Dr. Seuss, he also worked as a puppeteer in The Muppets, Where the Wild Things Are, Dr. Dolittle, Jack Frost, The Flintstones in Viva Rock Vegas, and Cats & Dogs.

Outside of the Henson company, he was an on-set animation reference puppeteer and voice actor for the movies Monkeybone and Looney Tunes: Back in Action (as Pepé Le Pew). For Disney, he is also a voice double for Timon from The Lion King. He has voiced Timon in Kingdom Hearts II, Disney Think Fast, and Disney's Wild About Safety shorts. He has also performed a voice sample for an additional character in the 2011 Spyro game, Skylanders: Spyro's Adventure.

== Filmography ==
=== Film ===
- Spaced Invaders - Pez (voice)
- Muppet Classic Theater - Additional Muppets
- Theodore Rex - Theodore Rex (face performer), Oliver Rex (face performer)
- The Adventures of Pinocchio - Principal puppeteer of Pinocchio
- Jack Frost - Jack Frost (in-suit performer)
- Can of Worms - Bom
- The Flintstones in Viva Rock Vegas - Puppeteer, character voices
- Muppets from Space - Additional puppeteer performer
- The Adventures of Elmo in Grouchland - Additional Muppets
- Monkeybone - Street Squash Raccoon (voice)
- Cats & Dogs - Mr. Tinkles (face performer)
- The Country Bears - Henry Dixon Taylor (face performer)
- Looney Tunes: Back in Action - Puppeteer and voice of Pepé Le Pew
- Sid the Science Kid: The Movie - Bobbybot, Ira, and Zippa
- Where the Wild Things Are - Puppeteer
- Cats & Dogs: The Revenge of Kitty Galore - Puppeteer
- The Muppets - Additional puppet performer
- Muppets Most Wanted - Puppeteer
- The Happytime Murders - Additional puppet performer

=== Television ===
- Nanny & Isaiah series - Mrs. Fingle Beezer
- Popples - Puppet operator
- Perfect Strangers - Ventriloquist
- The Legend of Prince Valiant - Additional voices
- ABC Weekend Specials - Doc Peppers
- Dinosaurs - Charlene Sinclair (face performer), Les, Devil, Babysitter, Judge, Ed, UFO Host, Announcer, Shelly, Dr. Ficus, Walter Sternhagen, Larry, Stu, Mel Luster (face performer), Buddy Glimmer, various characters
- The Adventures of Timmy the Tooth - Sidney Cyclops, Big Dan, Mumfred's Father, Miss Sweetie, Kay
- Mr. Willowby's Christmas Tree - Bear, Owl
- The Wubbulous World of Dr. Seuss - The Cat in the Hat, Fox in Socks, Captain Zauber, Additional Muppets
- Muppets on Wheels - Lindy, Semi Truck Driver
- Aliens in the Family - Puppeteer
- Muppets Tonight - Swiss Cheese, Additional Muppets
- Family Guy - Additional voices
- Studio DC: Almost Live - Additional Muppets
- Teeny Tiny Dogs - Dinky (voice)
- Good Luck Charlie - Additional puppet performer
- No, You Shut Up! - Matt Rosenberg
- Lady Gaga & the Muppets' Holiday Spectacular - Additional puppet performer
- Grid Smasher - Additional puppeteer
- Oscar's Hotel for Fantastical Creatures - Ginger Root
- The Muppets - Additional puppet performer
- Mr. Neighbor's House - Officer Policecop, Demon #3
- Bob the Builder - Additional voices (US Dub)
- The Muppet Show - Supporting Muppet Performer (credited as B Lanoil)

=== Video games ===
- Ys: Book 1&2 - Luta Gemma
- The Nightmare Before Christmas: Oogie's Revenge - Additional voices
- Kingdom Hearts II - Timon
- Kingdom Hearts II: Final Mix+ - Timon
- Disney Th!nk Fast - Timon
- Skylanders: Spyro's Adventure - Additional voices
