= Dinosaurs (TV series) =

American television sitcom (1991–1994)

- Genre: Sitcom; Puppetry; Satire; Slapstick
- Created by: Michael Jacobs; Bob Young
- Developed by: Jim Henson
- Voices of: Stuart Pankin; Jessica Walter; Jason Willinger; Sally Struthers; Kevin Clash
- Theme music composer: Bruce Broughton
- Opening theme: Bruce Broughton
- Composers: Bruce Broughton; Ray Colcord
- Country of origin: United States
- Original language: English
- No. of seasons: 4
- No. of episodes: 65 (list of episodes)

Production
- Executive producers: Michael Jacobs; Brian Henson
- Producers: Mark Brull; Dave Caplan; Tim Doyle; Victor Fresco; Andy Goodman; Jeff McCracken; Peter Ocko; Dava Savel; Kirk Thatcher; Rob Ulin; Bob Young
- Running time: 23 minutes
- Production companies: Michael Jacobs Productions; Jim Henson Productions; Walt Disney Television

Original release
- Network: ABC
- Release: April 26, 1991 – July 20, 1994

Dinosaurs is an American family sitcom television series that aired on ABC from April 26, 1991, to July 20, 1994. The show, about a family of anthropomorphic dinosaurs, was produced by Michael Jacobs Productions and Jim Henson Productions in association with Walt Disney Television. The characters were designed by Henson team member Kirk Thatcher.

== Origins and development ==
News stories written at the time of the show's premiere highlighted Dinosaurs' connection to Jim Henson, who had died the year before. Henson conceived the show in 1988, according to an article in The New York Times, adding he wanted it to be a sitcom, but about a family of dinosaurs. Until the success of The Simpsons, according to Alex Rockwell, a vice president of the Henson organization, "people thought it was a crazy idea."

In the late 1980s, Henson worked with William Stout, a fantasy artist, illustrator and designer, on a feature film starring animatronic dinosaurs with the working title of The Natural History Project; a 1993 article in The New Yorker said that Henson continued to work on a dinosaur project (presumably Dinosaurs) until the "last months of his life."

The television division of The Walt Disney Company began working on the series in 1990 for CBS before the series landed on ABC, which Disney eventually acquired.

Rafael Montemayor Aguiton of Vulture wrote that upon premiere the show "was a hit", and Michael Jacobs stated that this was why the network did not interfere much in the production.

Aguiton wrote that ratings suffered from the show being moved to different time slots on the network. The animatronics made the show relatively expensive, with cast member Stuart Pankin recalling that "I heard it was the most expensive half-hour TV show, at least at that point" and that this contributed to the cancellation.

== Plot ==
Dinosaurs is initially set in 60,000,000 BC in Pangaea. The show centers on the Sinclair family: Earl Sneed Sinclair (father), Fran Sinclair (née Phillips – mother), their three children (Robbie, Charlene, and infant Baby Sinclair) and Fran's mother, Ethyl.

Earl's job is to push over trees for the Wesayso Corporation with his friend and coworker Roy Hess, where they work under the supervision of their boss, Bradley P. Richfield.

== Characters ==
The focus of the show's plot is the Sinclair family: Earl, Fran, Robbie, Charlene, Baby, and Ethyl. The family name is a reference to the Sinclair Oil Corporation, which had prominently featured a dinosaur as its logo and mascot for decades, under the belief that petroleum deposits were formed during the age of the dinosaurs. Other character and family names throughout the series often referred to rival petroleum companies: Phillips, Hess, B.P., Richfield, and Ethyl, among others.

=== Main characters ===
- Earl Sneed Sinclair (face performed by Dave Goelz in season 1-2, Mak Wilson in season 3-4, performed by Bill Barretta, voiced by Stuart Pankin) is a Megalosaurus and the patriarch of the Sinclair family. He is depicted as being thick-headed and suggestible. Earl works as a tree pusher at the Wesayso Development Corporation.
- Fran Phillips-Sinclair (face performed by Allan Trautman, performed by Mitchell Young Evans in season 1-2, Tony Sabin Prince in season 3-4, voiced by Jessica Walter) is an Allosaurus who is the mother and homemaker of the Sinclair family. Earl affectionately calls his wife "Frannie".
- Robbie Sinclair (face performed by Steve Whitmire, performed by Leif Tilden, voiced by Jason Willinger) is a Hypsilophodon who is Earl and Fran's son and oldest child. Robbie stands out with his red varsity jacket and bright red sneakers.
- Charlene Sinclair (face performed by Bruce Lanoil, performed by Michelan Sisti, voiced by Sally Struthers) is a Protoceratops who is Earl and Fran's only daughter and middle child. Charlene stands out by wearing sweaters, necklaces, and earrings.
- Baby Sinclair (performed and voiced by Kevin Clash, assisted in the arms by Terri Hardin in season 1-3, Julianne Buescher in season 4) is a Megalosaurus who is Earl and Fran's son and youngest child. His legal name is Baby Sinclair, which was given to him by the Chief Elder. Baby is sarcastic and wisecracking. His favorite thing to do is to hit Earl on the head with a frying pan. Jacobs stated that the popularity of Baby contributed to the network allowing the creators to run the show as they saw fit stating: "As long as the Baby hit his father over the head with a pot, we could use that to hide anything."

=== Supporting characters ===
- Ethyl Hinkleman Phillips (performed by Brian Henson in season 1-2, Rickey Boyd in season 3-4, voiced by Florence Stanley) is an Edmontonia who is Fran's mother, Earl's mother-in-law, and the maternal grandmother of Robbie, Charlene, and Baby. Ethyl comes to live with the Sinclairs and is revealed to have a son named Stan (Fran's brother). Ethyl always wears house slippers and uses a wheelchair. Ethyl enjoys making fun of Earl and hitting him with her cane.
- Roy Danger Hess (face performed by David Greenaway, performed by Pons Maar, voiced by Sam McMurray) is a Tyrannosaurus rex who is Earl's best friend and co-worker at Wesayso.
- B.P. Richfield (face performed by Steve Whitmire, occasionally understudied by Rob Mills, arms and hands performed by Leif Tilden, voiced by Sherman Hemsley) is a Triceratops who oversees the tree pushers at Wesayso.
- Monica DeVertebrae (performed by Julianne Buescher, voiced by Suzie Plakson) is a Brontosaurus and Fran's best friend. She is usually seen from the neck up and any exterior shots of her body outside are done with claymation. It took three or four people to operate her neck and head.
- Spike (performed by David Greenaway, voiced by Christopher Meloni) is a Polacanthus and the best friend of Robbie, who often refers to him as "Scooter". Spike is normally a bad influence on Robbie, whom he enjoys belittling and goading into dangerous or humiliating situations.
- Ralph Needlenose (occasionally performed by James Murray and Allan Trautman at different points) is a Troodon who is a co-worker of Earl and Roy at Wesayso.
- Gus Spikeback is a Ceratosaurus who is a co-worker of Earl and Roy at Wesayso.
- Sid Turtlepuss (face performed by John Kennedy, performed and voiced by Michelan Sisti) is a Psittacosaurus who is a co-worker of Earl and Roy at Wesayso.
- Mr. Pulman (face performed by Allan Trautman, performed by Bruce Lanoil in the first appearance, Tom Fisher in later appearances, voiced by Allan Trautman) is a bespectacled Troodon who is Robbie, Charlene, Mindy, and Spike's teacher at Bob LaBrea High School.
- Mindy (face performed by Julianne Buescher, performed by Star Townsend, voiced by Jessica Lundy) is a Corythosaurus who is Charlene's best friend.
- Howard Handupme (performed by Kevin Clash) is a Pachycephalosaurus who works as a newscaster for DNN (Dinosaur News Network).
- The Chief Elder is the ruler of Pangaea and is said to be the head of the Council of Elders. Multiple versions of the character appear throughout the series.
  - The first Chief Elder, a Protoceratops, appears in the episode "Nuts to War", performed by Steve Whitmire and voiced by George Gaynes.
  - The second Chief Elder, a Dryptosaurus, appears in the episode "And the Winner Is...", voiced by Sam McMurray. This Chief Elder later dies of a heart attack when naming Baby Sinclair and is succeeded by political analyst Edward R. Hero.
  - The third Chief Elder appears in the episode "Green Card", performed by Mak Wilson and voiced by Joe Flaherty.
  - The fourth Chief Elder appears in the episode "The Greatest Story Never Sold", performed by Allan Trautman and voiced by Tim Curry.
  - The sixth Chief Elder appears in the episode "Working Girl", performed by Allan Trautman and voiced by Joe Flaherty.
- Mr. Lizard (performed by Bill Barretta in "The Golden Child", Allan Trautman in later appearances) is an Iguanodon who is the star of Ask Mr. Lizard, an educational series watched by Earl and Baby. Ask Mr. Lizard is a parody of the series Watch Mr. Wizard.
- Timmy (performed by Kirk Thatcher) is the name of several young dinosaurs who work as Mr. Lizard's assistant. They have a tendency to be killed off and replaced.

=== Other characters ===
- Gary (voiced by Steve Landesberg) is a 50 ft. Dilophosaurus who takes a romantic interest in Fran, and challenges Earl for her.
- Blarney (performed by Steve Whitmire) is a Deinonychus who appeared in Dinosaur TV segments in two fourth-season episodes – "Terrible Twos" and "Into the Woods". He is a parody of Barney the Dinosaur.
- Henri Poupon (performed by Allan Trautman, voiced by Tim Curry) is an Archaeopteryx who appeared in the episode "Getting to Know You". Henri is the father of Francois Poupon and husband of Simone Poupon. The Poupons come from an unnamed country outside of Pangaea.
- Simone Poupon (performed by Julianne Buescher) is an Archaeopteryx who is the wife of Henri and the mother of Francois.
- Francois Poupon (performed by Bruce Lanoil) is an Archaeopteryx who is the son of Henri Poupon and Simone Poupon. Francois was eaten by Baby Sinclair.
- The Monster (performed by Allan Trautman) is an unnamed Glyptodon who appeared in the episode "Monster Under the Bed". When thought to be the titular monster that has been lurking under Baby Sinclair's bed, it turns out that he was lurking under their house, which they built over his house. As a compromise, the Sinclair family's house is moved away from the Monster's house.
- Georgie (face performed by Allan Trautman, performed by Jack Tate, voiced by Allan Trautman in his good voice, Ed Asner in his evil voice) is a dinosaur dressed as a European hippopotamus who hosts the series The Georgie Show. He appears as kind-hearted. In reality, Georgie is a megalomaniac planning to take over the world through his financial empire and the devotion of the dinosaur children. Like Blarney, Georgie is also a parody of Barney the Dinosaur.

=== Unisaurs ===
Outside of the recurring characters, there are a group of dinosaur characters called Unisaurs, whose puppet model was used for multiple characters. Some of the Unisaurs are Full-Bodied while the others are hand-puppets.

==== Full-Bodied Unisaurs ====
- Longsnout is a green Dryptosaurus. Longsnout's puppet is used for the following characters:
  - Ansel from the episode "Driving Miss Ethyl" (face performed by Julianne Buescher, performed by Pons Maar, voiced by Michael McKean).
  - The Babysitter from the episode "Terrible Twos" (face performed by Bruce Lanoil, performed by Tom Fisher, voiced by John Glover).
  - Buddy Glimmer from the episode "Family Challenge" (face performed by David Greenaway, performed by Jack Tate, voiced by Sam McMurray).
  - The Chef from the episode "Working Girl" (face performed by David Greenaway, performed by Jack Tate, voiced by Thom Sharp).
  - The Devil from the episode "Life in the Faust Lane" (face performed by Bruce Lanoil, performed by Pons Maar, voiced by Tim Curry).
  - Dr. Ficus from the episode "Germ Warfare" (face performed by Bruce Lanoil, performed by Pons Maar, voiced by Charles Kimbrough).
  - Ed from the episode "Scent of a Reptile" (face performed by David Greenaway, performed by Jack Tate, voiced by Thom Sharp).
  - Jerry Valentine from the episode "Fran Live" (face performed by Bruce Lanoil, performed by Jack Tate, voiced by Tony Shalhoub).
  - Mel Luster from the episode "The Mating Dance" (face performed by Bruce Lanoil, performed by Jack Tate, voiced by Richard Portnow).
  - Officer Decker from "Monster Under the Bed" (face performed by Rickey Boyd, performed by Jack Tate, voiced by Thom Sharp).
  - Stu Boomird from the episode "Network Genius" (face performed by Bruce Lanoil, performed by Jack Tate, voiced by Jason Alexander).
  - Ty Warner from the episode "Swamp Music" (face performed by Bruce Lanoil, performed by Pons Maar, voiced by Jon Polito).
  - Walter Sternhagen from the episode "The Discovery" (face performed by Bruce Lanoil, performed by Pons Maar, voiced by Thom Sharp).
- Needlenose is a Troodon with an elongated snout. In addition to being used for Mr. Pulman and Ralph Needlenose, this Unisaur was used for:
  - The Doctor from the episode "Golden Child" (face performed by David Greenaway, performed by Tom Fisher, voiced by Sam McMurray).
  - Dr. Herder from the episode "Terrible Twos" (face performed by David Greenaway, performed by Tom Fisher, voiced by Michael McKean).
  - Glenda Molehill from the episode "Switched at Birth" (face performed by Bruce Lanoil, performed by Tom Fisher, voiced by Mimi Kennedy).
  - Hank from the episode "Refrigerator Day" (voiced by Bill Barretta).
  - Heather Worthington from the episode "A Slave to Fashion" (face performed by Terri Hardin, performed by Tom Fisher, voiced by Julia Louis-Dreyfus).
- Spikeback is a bulky Ceratosaurus with a striped back, striped tail, and a nose horn. In addition to being used for Gus Spikeback, Spikeback's puppet model was used for:
  - Al "Sexual" Harris from the episode "What "Sexual" Harris Meant" (face performed by Bruce Lanoil, performed by Jack Tate, voiced by Jason Alexander).
  - Andre from the episode "Leader of the Pack" (face performed by Mak Wilson, performed by Jack Tate, voiced by Sam McMurray).
  - Bob the DMV Worker from the episode "Unmarried...With Children" (face performed by David Greenaway, performed by Jack Tate, voiced by David Wohl).
  - Dolf from the episode "Steroids to Heaven" (face performed by Allan Trautman, performed by Jack Tate, voiced by Sam McMurray).
  - Frau Woodhouse from the episode "Terrible Twos" (face performed by Julianne Buescher, performed by Jack Tate, voiced by Julianne Buescher).
  - Gus Molehill from the episode "Switched at Birth" (face performed by David Greenaway, performed by Jack Tate, voiced by Jason Alexander).
  - Hank Hibler from the episode "Charlene and her Amazing Humans" (face performed by Allan Trautman, performed by Jack Tate, voiced by Jeffrey Tambor).
  - The Job Wizard from the episode "Career Opportunities" (face performed by David Greenaway, performed by Jack Tate, voiced by Jason Alexander).
  - Lucius from the episode "The Last Temptation of Ethyl" (face performed by David Greenaway, performed by Jack Tate, voiced by John Glover).
  - Ray Gherkin from the episode "Scent of a Reptile" (face performed by Rickey Boyd, performed by Jack Tate, voiced by Glenn Shadix).
  - Richard from the episode "Refrigerator Day" (face performed by John Kennedy, performed by Jack Tate, voiced by Thom Sharp).
  - Shelly from the episode "Dirty Dancin'" (face performed by Bruce Lanoil, performed by Jack Tate, voiced by Conchata Ferrell).
- Turtlepuss is a brown Psittacosaurus. In addition to Sid Turtlepuss, Turtlepuss's puppet model was used for:
  - Crazy Lou from the episode "Leader of the Pack" (face performed by Julianne Buescher, performed by Michelan Sisti, voiced by Ken Hudson Campbell).
  - The Clerk from the episode "The Son Also Rises" (face performed by Bruce Lanoil, performed by Jody St. Michael, voiced by Robert Picardo).
  - The Dinosaur Chief from the episode "Hurling Day" (face performed by Kevin Clash, performed by Michelan Sisti, voiced by Harold Gould).
  - The Folk Singer from the episode "I Never Ate My Father" (face performed by John Kennedy, performed by Michelan Sisti, voiced by Steven Banks).
  - Frank from the episode "Fran Live" (performed by Michelan Sisti, voiced by Thom Sharp).
  - General H. Norman Conquest from the episode "Nuts to War" (face performed by John Kennedy, performed by Michelan Sisti, voiced by Jason Alexander).
  - Hank from the episode "Life in the Faust Lane" (face performed by David Greenaway, performed by Michelan Sisti, voiced by Michael McKean).
  - The Insurance Agent from the episode "Family Challenge" (face performed by Bruce Lanoil, performed by Jack Tate, voiced by Peter Bonerz).
  - Jean-Claude from the episode "Georgie Must Die" (face performed by David Greenaway, performed by Michelan Sisti, voiced by Tim Curry).
  - Mr. Myman from the episode "Out of the Frying Pan" (face performed by David Greenaway, performed by Leif Tilden, voiced by Michael McKean).
  - The Muse from the episode "Charlene's Flat World" (face performed by John Kenendy, performed by Jack Tate, voiced by Robert Picardo).
  - Officer Bettelheim from the episode "License to Parent" (face performed by David Greenaway, performed by Michelan Sisti, voiced by Michael McKean).
  - The Odd Job Dinosaur from the episode "How to Pick Up Girls".
  - Police Chief Parish from the episode "Monster Under the Bed" (face performed by Rickey Body, performed by Michelan Sisti, voiced by Michael McKean).
  - Ted Hardshell from the episode "Network Genius" (face performed by Allan Trautman, performed by Michelan Sisti, voiced by Robert Picardo).
  - UFO Host from the episode "We Are Not Alone" (face performed by Bruce Lanoil, performed by Michelan Sisti, voiced by Jason Alexander).
  - Zabar from the episode "Germ Warfare" (face performed by David Greenaway, performed by Michelan Sisti, voiced by Dan Castellaneta).
- An unnamed Corythosaurus puppet was used for Mindy and several other characters:
  - Caroline Foxworth from the episodes "How to Pick Up Girls" and "Steroids to Heaven" (face performed by Julianne Buescher, performed by Star Townsend, voiced by Julianne Buescher).
  - Sally from the episode "Out of the Frying Pan" (face performed by Julianne Buescher, performed by Star Townsend, voiced by Suzie Plakson).
  - Thighs of Thunder from the episode "The Discovery" (face performed by Julianne Buescher, performed by Star Townsend, voiced by Suzie Plakson).
  - Wendy Richfield from the episode "Hungry for Love" (face performed by Julianne Buescher, performed by Michelan Sisti, voiced by Wendie Jo Sperber).

==== Hand Puppet Unisaurs ====
The following are the Hand Puppet Unisaurs that are often used for audience members, elders, television personalities, and any other character that would mostly be seen from the waist up:

- An Iguanodon hand puppet was used for Mr. Lizard and other characters.
- A Parasaurolophus hand puppet was used mostly for female characters, including a Jury Foreman from the episode "Earl's Big Jackpot".
- A Stegosaurus hand puppet was used for the following characters:
  - A Government Clerk from the episode "And the Winners Is...".
  - A Newsboy from the episode "Charlene's Flat World".
  - A USO Soldier and Stagehand from the episode "Nuts to War".
- A cleft-chinned Tyrannosaurus hand puppet that was used for assorted news reporters.
- A brown Corythosaurus hand puppet was used for a Guy in Labcoat (voiced by Michael McKean) and Jury Foreman from the episode "Charlene's Flat World".
- A hand puppet of an unidentified species was used for four of the Chief Elders, as well as the following characters:
  - Dr. Elliott Piaget from the episode "Terrible Twos" (performed by Allan Trautman).
  - Edward R. Hero from the episode "And the Winner Is..." (performed by Allan Trautman, voiced by Jason Bernard).
  - Grandpa Louie from "The Last Temptation of Ethyl" (performed by Allan Trautman, voiced by Buddy Hackett).
  - John McGlutton from the episode "Network Genius" (voiced by Sam McMurray).
  - Judge H.T. Stone from the episode "Charlene's Flat World" (performed by Steve Whitmire, voiced by Paxton Whitehead).
  - Mr. Ashland from the episode "Power Erupts" (performed by Kevin Clash, voiced by John Vernon).
  - Mr. Mason Dixon from the episode "What "Sexual" Harris Meant" (voiced by Steve Whitmire).
  - Winston from the episode "Earl's Big Jackpot" (performed by Allan Trautman, voiced by Tim Curry).
  - A blue Protoceratops hand puppet was used for one of the Chief Elders, as well as the following characters:
    - Elder #2 from the episode "Charlene's Flat World".
    - Judge D.X. Machina from the episode "Earl's Big Jackpot" (performed by Bruce Lanoil).
    - Mr. Harold Heffer from the episode "What "Sexual" Harris Meant" (performed by Bruce Lanoil, voiced by Jack Harrell).
    - A Shopper from the episode "Power Erupts" (voiced by Edie McClurg).

=== Cavepeople ===
The Cavepeople are background characters that appear in different episodes and often interact with the dinosaurs. A running gag is that the dinosaurs are unable to distinguish the genders of the cavepeople. They are always listed after the Dinosaur Performers in the end credits.

- The cavepeople from "The Mighty Megalosaurus" were seen inventing a hula hoop. They were portrayed by Teri LaPorte and Michelan Sisti.
- Two cavemen named Ling Ling and Chang Chang appear in "The Mating Dance" where the dinosaurs try to get them to mate with each other. They were portrayed by Jeff Chayette and Perri Anzilotti respectively. A cavewoman also appears in that episode portrayed by Julianne Buescher.
- A TV caveman named Mr. Ugh appeared in "Hurling Day" as a caveman owned by a dinosaur named Woodrow. Besides being a parody of Mr. Ed, he is portrayed by Michelan Sisti and voiced by John Kennedy.
- A cavewoman named Sparky appeared in "Employee of the Month" where Robbie saved her from the dissecting table at Bob LaBrea High School and lived with the Sinclair family before being released into the wild. She is portrayed by Hanna Cutrona. The other cavepeople in that episode were portrayed by Paula Marshall and Michelan Sisti.
- The Wereman from "Little Boy Boo" is a character from Robbie's scary story where Robbie was bitten by a rabid wereman and became one himself. The Wereman is a parody of the werewolf. The Rabid Wereman was portrayed by Bill Barretta and Robbie's version of the Wereman was portrayed by Kirk Thatcher.
- The Elder Caveman in "The Discovery" was a member of a tribe of cavepeople that lived on a land that Earl discovered which WESAYSO wanted to develop on. He was portrayed by Michelan Sisti.
- The Cavelings are three young cavepeople that appear in "Charlene and Her Amazing Humans" where they are briefly adopted by Charlene. They were portrayed by Ben Ryan Ganger, Allison McCraw, and Tiffany Taubman.
- The Caveling's Mother appears in "Charlen and Her Amazing Humans". She is portrayed by Jane Gootnick.

== Episodes ==
Season	Episodes		Originally released		
Season	Episodes		First released	Last released	Network
1	5		April 26, 1991	May 24, 1991	ABC
2	24		September 18, 1991	May 6, 1992	ABC
3	22		September 18, 1992	July 2, 1993	ABC
4	14	7	June 1, 1994	July 20, 1994	ABC
4	14	7	September 6, 1995	November 10, 1995	Syndication

== Topical issues ==
Although Dinosaurs is targeted at a family audience, the show touched upon multiple topical issues, which include environmentalism, endangered species, women's rights, sexual harassment, LGBT rights, objectification of women, censorship, civil rights, body image, steroid use, allusions to masturbation (in the form of Robbie doing the solo mating dance), drug abuse, racism (in the form of a dispute between the two-legged dinosaurs and the four-legged dinosaurs), peer pressure, rights of indigenous peoples (in the form of the dinosaurs interacting with cavepeople), corporate crime, government interference in parenting, and pacifism.

In the episode "I Never Ate for My Father," in lieu of carnivorism, Robbie chooses to eat vegetables, which the show uses as a metaphor for homosexuality, communism, drug abuse and counter culture.

The 2-part episode "Nuts to War" was a satire of American involvement in the Gulf War, with two-legged dinosaurs going to war with four-legged dinosaurs over pistachios instead of oil.

In the final season, "The Greatest Story Ever Sold" (a take-off of The Greatest Story Ever Told) references religion when the Sinclair family becomes eager to learn the meaning of their existence. The Elders dictate a new system of beliefs, and the entire cast (with the exception of Robbie) abandons science to blindly follow the newly popular "Potato-ism".

Another religious-themed episode was "The Last Temptation of Ethyl", in which Ethyl willingly allows a televangelist to exploit her near-death experience to extort money from followers. She backs out after having a second such experience, where instead of heaven, she experiences a "place not so nice": an existence surrounded by nothing but multiple Earl Sneed Sinclairs.

Several jokes in the series were at the expense of television shows in general. Earl often wants to watch TV rather than do something more practical, and several jokes accuse television of "dumbing down" the population and making it lazy.

Captain Action Figure shows up in children's programming that Fran mistakes for a commercial. Whenever Captain Action Figure mentions a product, the screen flashes "Tell Mommy I WANT THAT!". Before the appearance of Georgie, Dinosaurs used a puppet reminiscent of Barney the Dinosaur named "Blarney" in two episodes. During his appearances, members of the Sinclair family commented on his annoying characteristics and failure to teach anything to children.

The characters will sometimes break the fourth wall as well, especially Baby. An example of such is seen in the episode "Nature Calls" (Season 3, Episode 1) when Fran and Earl spell out words in front of Baby during an argument, who, after looking at the camera and saying "This could get ugly", proceeds to spell out "They think I can't spell" with his alphabet blocks.

=== Series finale ===
The final episode of Dinosaurs produced and aired on ABC was intended as the series finale (Note: Seven episodes set prior to "Changing Nature", which had not previously aired on ABC, first aired in television syndication in fall 1994, with "Scent of a Reptile" being the final episode to premiere. Ordering on digital platforms varies, however Disney+ now lists the final season episodes in production order ending with "Changing Nature".) and depicts the irresponsible actions of the dinosaurs toward their environment, and the ensuing Ice Age which leads to their demise.

Stuart Pankin, the voice of Earl, stated that the ending "was a simplistic and heartfelt social comment, yet it was very powerful" with "subtlety" being a defining aspect.

The television series creators decided to make this finale as a way of ending the series as they knew the show could be canceled when they created season 4. Michael Jacobs stated that "We certainly wanted to make the episode to be educational to the audience", and as people knew dinosaurs were no longer alive, "The show would end by completing the metaphor and showing that extinction." Ted Harbert, president of ABC, expressed discomfort at the ending in a telephone call, but allowed it to go forward.

Jacobs stated that correspondence from parents revealed that "They understood the creativity in the final episode, and they were sad at the predicament we presented in the story." Pankin stated that "Everybody was at first shocked, but I think it was more of a reaction to the show ending." Pankin stated that he did not remember a significant number of audience members being angry about the ending. In 2018, Jacobs stated that the episode would have trended on social media had it been released that year.

Noel Murray of The A.V. Club stated that the episode "delivered as blunt an environmental message as any major network TV broadcast since The Lorax." Brian Galindo of BuzzFeed described it as being shocking for children.

== International screening ==
In the United Kingdom, the show was screened on ITV in 1992 and in reruns from 1995 to 2002 on Disney Channel. In Canada, the show started airing reruns in 1992 on The Family Channel and aired them until the late 1990s; the show also aired on CHRO-TV in the early-to-mid 1990s. In Australia, the show started airing on the Seven Network from February 1992 through to 1995. In Ireland, in the mid-1990s, it was shown on a Sunday evening on RTÉ Two (known as network 2 back then). In 1994, it was shown in Italy on Rai 1. The show has also aired on TV3, then moved in 2003 to TV2 in New Zealand, KBC in Kenya and M-Net in South Africa. In Brazil the show started airing on Rede Globo from 1992 to 1999, on SBT from 2003 to 2005, on Band from 2007 to 2011, and on Canal Viva in 2014. In Mexico the show was aired on Canal 5.

== Home media ==
The first three volumes were released on VHS on December 6, 1991. On May 2, 2006, Walt Disney Studios Home Entertainment released Dinosaurs: The Complete First and Second Seasons as a four-disc DVD box set. The DVD set includes "exclusive bonus features including a never-before-seen look at the making of Dinosaurs". The complete third and fourth seasons, also a four-disc DVD set, were released on May 1, 2007, with special features, including the episodes not aired on U.S. television. Both sets are currently available only in Region 1.

On September 29, 2017, Hulu acquired the streaming rights to Dinosaurs along with fellow Disney–ABC television properties Home Improvement and Boy Meets World, in addition to fellow TGIF programs Family Matters, Full House, Hangin' with Mr. Cooper, Perfect Strangers and Step by Step.

Dinosaurs was made available for streaming on Disney+ on January 29, 2021, for the United States, with the exception of the episode "A New Leaf".

== Reception ==
As of September 2022, the series as a whole has received an approval rating of 91% on review aggregator Rotten Tomatoes. Its first season received an approval rating of 83%, its consensus reads, "Dinosaurs, marries astonishingly expressive puppetry with genuinely funny satire of social norms, making for a forward-thinking prehistoric sitcom." While its fourth season received more critical praise, with a 100% approval rating.

=== Awards ===
Awards and nominations
Year	Award	Category	Nominated	Title	Result
1991	Primetime Emmy Awards	Outstanding Art Direction for a Series	John C. Mula, Brian Savegar, Kevin Pfeiffer	Episode: "The Mating Dance"	Won
1991	Primetime Emmy Awards	Outstanding Editing for a Series – Single Camera Production	Marco Zappia	Episode: "The Mighty Megalosaurus"	Nominated
1991	Television Critics Association Awards	Outstanding Achievement in Children's Programming			Nominated
1992	Motion Picture Sound Editors	Best Sound Editing – Television Episodic – Effects & Foley	Patrick M. Griffith		Nominated
1992	Environmental Media Awards	TV Comedy		Episode: "Power Erupts"	Won
1993	Environmental Media Awards	TV Comedy		Episode: "If You Were A Tree"	Won
1995	Environmental Media Awards	TV Comedy		Episode: "Changing Nature"	Won
