= Michelan Sisti =

Italian-American actor, puppeteer, director and musician

- Born: May 27, 1949 (age 76); San Juan, Puerto Rico
- Occupations: Actor; puppeteer; director; musician
- Years active: 1971–present

Michelan Sisti (born May 27, 1949) is an Italian/American actor born Michael Alan Sisti to parents, Mildred and Frank. He was born in San Juan, Puerto Rico while his father and family were stationed there for the US Army. He is also a puppeteer, director and musician who played Michelangelo in Teenage Mutant Ninja Turtles and its sequel Teenage Mutant Ninja Turtles II: The Secret of the Ooze. He previously had a twenty-year theatrical career including three Broadway shows: Motel the tailor in the 1981 revival of Fiddler on the Roof, Panda in Raggedy Ann (1986), and Bobby and understudy for the Emcee in the 1987 Cabaret revival. While understudying Joel Grey in the pre-Broadway tour of Cabaret, Grey lost his voice, and Sisti sang and spoke the role from off-stage while Grey performed onstage.

Since the Teenage Mutant Ninja Turtles films, Sisti moved from New York City to Los Angeles and has continued to work with The Jim Henson Company, Walt Disney Studios, and many other movie and television productions. From September 8–10, 2017, he was an additional Muppet performer for a live show at the Hollywood Bowl titled The Muppets Take the Bowl and again, in London, for The Muppets Take the O2 show from July 13–14, 2018.
