= Witless Protection =

- Directed by: Charles Robert Carner
- Screenplay by: Charles Robert Carner
- Story by: Charles Robert Carner; Alan C. Blomquist
- Produced by: J.P. Williams; Alan C. Blomquist
- Starring: Larry the Cable Guy; Ivana Miličević; Yaphet Kotto; Peter Stormare; Eric Roberts; Joe Mantegna; Jenny McCarthy
- Cinematography: Michael Goi
- Edited by: Marc Leif
- Music by: Eric Allaman
- Production companies: Samwilla; Shaler Entertainment; Parallel Entertainment
- Distributed by: Lionsgate
- Release date: February 22, 2008
- Running time: 99 minutes
- Country: United States
- Language: English
- Budget: $7.5 million
- Box office: $4.2 million

Witless Protection is a 2008 American crime comedy film written, and directed by Charles Robert Carner, and starring Larry the Cable Guy and Jenny McCarthy.

Distributed by Lionsgate, the film was theatrically released on February 22, 2008. It was critically panned and was a commercial failure, grossing $4.1 million.

It was the final film appearance of Yaphet Kotto before his retirement later that year from acting, and his death in 2021.

== Plot ==
Larry Stalder is a small-town deputy who dreams of becoming an FBI agent. He witnesses what he believes is a kidnapping and rushes to rescue a woman named Madeleine. The "kidnappers" turn out to be FBI agents assigned to protect her and deliver her to a big Enron-type corruption trial in Chicago.

After the misunderstanding is cleared, Larry attempts to deliver Madeleine to the agents and get a commendation letter from them until he discovers that they're corrupted. It's later revealed that they work for Arthur Grimsley, the criminal whom Madeleine is going to testify against, who also dumped her. While spending the night at a motel, Larry and Madeleine are found by the agents and escape. During their journey, they discover that the evidence against Arthur, contained within a disc, was stolen and is inside a safe in Arthur's mansion. After evading capture from Wilford Duvall, Arthur's head of security, they manage to keep the villains off track by faking Madeleine's death. Arriving in Chicago, Larry enters a charity polo match to get invited to a ball at Arthur's mansion. He manages to beat Arthur, who at first denies to invite him to the ball until Larry convinces him otherwise.

At the ball, Larry searches for the disc while Madeleine dances with Arthur to distract him. During the search, Larry encounters and defeats Wilford in the display room of the mansion. He then bargains with one of the corrupted FBI agents to let him go, in exchange for the money in the safe. After getting the disc, Larry and Madeleine manage to escape after Arthur easily deduces her identity and holds her hostage, forcing Larry to give him the disc to save Madeleine. It is later revealed that the disc Larry gave to Arthur was a video of him singing his favorite country song.

After sending Arthur to prison, the FBI offers Larry the opportunity to join them, but he refuses. He and Madeleine say goodbye and part ways. Upon returning home, Larry becomes the town sheriff and celebrates with his girlfriend Connie.

== Cast ==
- Daniel Whitney (Larry the Cable Guy) as Deputy Larry Stalder
- Ivana Miličević as Madeleine Demcowski
- Jenny McCarthy as Connie
- Joe Mantegna as Dr. Rondog "Doc" Savage
- Yaphet Kotto as Ricardo Bodi
- Richard Bull as Sheriff Smoot
- Eric Roberts as Wilford Duvall
- Peter Stormare as Arthur Grimsley
- J David Moeller as Elmer
- Sean Bridgers as Norm

== Production ==
Many parts of the film were filmed in Plano, Illinois and Virgil, Illinois (train depot, farms, gas station and a few downtown restaurants). Filming also took place in numerous towns in Illinois including Elmhurst, Lombard, Lemont, Sugar Grove, Glen Ellyn, Vernon Hills, Westmont and Yorkville.

== Reception ==
=== Critical response ===
Witless Protection received near unanimously negative reviews from critics. On the review aggregator website Rotten Tomatoes, 4% of 28 critics' reviews are positive, with an average rating of 2.6/10. The website's consensus reads: "Larry the Cable Guy continues his critical losing streak with this insipid, tasteless caper comedy." Metacritic, which uses a weighted average, assigned the film a score of 17 out of 100, based on 6 critics, indicating "overwhelming dislike".

Frank Scheck of The Hollywood Reporter wrote: "[I]n the press notes for Larry the Cable Guy's latest comedy, his co-stars are quoted at length describing the constant hilarity they experienced on the set. Unfortunately for filmgoers, little of that fun has made its way into the finished product, which makes his previous effort, Delta Farce, seem a classic by comparison." John Anderson of Variety criticized the film for carrying a "nasty edge" to its brand of blue-collar comedy aimed at Bush supporters and the misuse of McCarthy and Mantegna in embarrassing roles, concluding that: "One can only hope that Witless Protection is targeted at a vanishing species of American Neanderthal. In the meantime, perhaps Larry and his accomplices at Lionsgate could take some sensitivity training." Matt Zoller Seitz, writing for The New York Times, said "[T]he film's writer and director, Charles Robert Carner, is working on a critic-proof franchise and knows it; the slapstick and action set pieces are lame, and its performances range from competent to annoying." Steven Hyden of The A.V. Club gave the film an overall F grade, saying: "With Witless Protection—another lazy, wretched entry in an epically undistinguished filmography—Larry reveals that the joke is ultimately on his fans, and he's yukking it up all the way to the bank."

=== Accolades ===
The film received three nominations at the 29th Golden Raspberry Awards: Worst Actor for Larry the Cable Guy (who lost to Mike Myers for The Love Guru), Worst Supporting Actress for Jenny McCarthy (who lost to Paris Hilton for Repo! The Genetic Opera) and Worst Screen Couple for Larry the Cable Guy and Jenny McCarthy (they lost to Paris Hilton and either Christine Lakin or Joel David Moore for The Hottie and the Nottie).
