= Golden Raspberry Award for Worst Screenplay =

Award for worst film screenplay of the past year

- Awarded for: Worst screenplays for feature film
- Country: United States
- Presented by: Golden Raspberry Award Foundation
- First award: 1981 (to Bronte Woodard and Allan Carr for Can't Stop the Music)
- Currently held by: War of the Worlds (2025)
- Website: www.razzies.com

The Razzie Award for Worst Screenplay is an award presented at the annual Golden Raspberry Awards for the worst film screenplay of the past year. The following is a list of nominees and recipients of that award, including each screenplay's author(s).

== 1980s ==
- 1980 Can't Stop the Music, written by Bronté Woodard and Allan Carr
  - A Change of Seasons, written by Erich Segal, Ronni Kern and Fred Segal
  - Cruising, written by William Friedkin
  - The Formula, written by Steve Shagan
  - It's My Turn, written by Eleanor Bergstein
  - Middle Age Crazy, written by Carl Kleinschmidt
  - Raise the Titanic, written by Adam Kennedy and Eric Hughes
  - Touched by Love, written by Hesper Anderson
  - Windows, written by Barry Siegel
  - Xanadu, written by Richard C. Danus and Marc C. Rubel
- 1981 Mommie Dearest, screenplay by Frank Yablans, Frank Perry, Tracy Hotchner and Robert Getchell, based on the memoir by Christina Crawford
  - Endless Love, screenplay by Judith Rascoe, based on the novel by Scott Spencer
  - Heaven's Gate, written by Michael Cimino
  - S.O.B., written by Blake Edwards
  - Tarzan, the Ape Man, screenplay by Tom Rowe and Gary Goddard, based on characters created by Edgar Rice Burroughs
- 1982 Inchon, written by Robin Moore and Laird Koenig
  - Annie, screenplay by Carol Sobieski, based on the play by Thomas Meehan, based on the comic strip Little Orphan Annie created by Harold Gray (uncredited)
  - Butterfly, screenplay by John Goff and Matt Cimber, adaptation by Matt Cimber, based on the novel by James M. Cain
  - The Pirate Movie, written by Trevor Farrant, "ripped off from" Gilbert and Sullivan's operetta The Pirates of Penzance
  - Yes, Giorgio, screenplay by Norman Steinberg, "suggested" by the novel by Annie Piper
- 1983 The Lonely Lady, screenplay by John Kershaw and Shawn Randall, adaptation by Ellen Shephard, from the novel by Harold Robbins
  - Flashdance, screenplay by Tom Hedley and Joe Eszterhas, story by Tom Hedley
  - Hercules, screenplay by Luigi Cozzi
  - Jaws 3-D, screenplay by Richard Matheson and Carl Gottlieb, story by Guerdon Trueblood, "suggested" by the Peter Benchley novel Jaws
  - Two of a Kind, written by John Herzfeld
- 1984 Bolero, written by John Derek
  - Cannonball Run II, screenplay by Harvey Miller, Hal Needham and Albert S. Ruddy
  - Rhinestone, screenplay by Phil Alden Robinson and Sylvester Stallone, story by Phil Alden Robinson
  - Sheena, screenplay by David Newman and Lorenzo Semple Jr., story by David Newman and Leslie Stevens, based on the comic by S.M. Eiger and Will Eisner (uncredited)
  - Where the Boys Are '84, screenplay by Stu Krieger and Jeff Burkhart, "suggested" by the novel by Glendon Swarthout
- 1985 Rambo: First Blood Part II, screenplay by Sylvester Stallone and James Cameron, story by Kevin Jarre, based on characters created by David Morrell
  - Fever Pitch, written by Richard Brooks
  - Perfect, screenplay by Aaron Latham and James Bridges, based on articles in Rolling Stone magazine by Aaron Latham
  - Rocky IV, written by Sylvester Stallone
  - Year of the Dragon, screenplay by Oliver Stone and Michael Cimino, based on the novel by Robert Daley
- 1986 Howard the Duck, written by Willard Huyck and Gloria Katz, based on the Marvel Comics character created by Steve Gerber
  - 9½ Weeks, screenplay by Patricia Louisianna Knop & Zalman King and Sarah Kernochan, based on the novel by Elizabeth McNeill
  - Cobra, screenplay by Sylvester Stallone, based on the novel Fair Game by Paula Gosling
  - Shanghai Surprise, screenplay by John Kohn and Robert Bentley, based on the novel Faraday's Flowers by Tony Kenrick
  - Under the Cherry Moon, screenplay by Becky Johnston
- 1987 Leonard Part 6, screenplay by Jonathan Reynolds, story by Bill Cosby
  - Ishtar, written by Elaine May
  - Jaws: The Revenge, screenplay by Michael deGuzma, based on characters created by Peter Benchley
  - Tough Guys Don't Dance, screenplay by Norman Mailer, based on his novel
  - Who's That Girl, screenplay by Andrew Smith and Ken Finkleman, story by Andrew Smith
- 1988 Cocktail, screenplay by Heywood Gould, based on his book
  - Hot to Trot, screenplay by Steven Neigher, Hugo Gilbert and Charlie Peters, story by Steven Neigher and Hugo Gilbert
  - Mac and Me, written by Stewart Raffill and Steve Feke
  - Rambo III, written by Sylvester Stallone and Sheldon Lettich, based on characters created by David Morrell
  - Willow, screenplay by Bob Dolman, story by George Lucas
- 1989 Harlem Nights, written by Eddie Murphy
  - The Karate Kid Part III, screenplay by Robert Mark Kamen, based on characters created by Robert Mark Kamen
  - Road House, screenplay by David Lee Henry and Hilary Henkin, story by David Lee Henry
  - Star Trek V: The Final Frontier, screenplay by David Loughery, story by William Shatner & Harve Bennett & David Loughery, based on the television series created by Gene Roddenberry
  - Tango & Cash, written by Randy Feldman

== 1990s ==
- 1990 The Adventures of Ford Fairlane, screenplay by Daniel Waters, James Cappe & David Arnott, based on characters created by Rex Weiner
  - The Bonfire of the Vanities, screenplay by Michael Cristofer, based on the novel by Tom Wolfe
  - Ghosts Can't Do It, written by John Derek
  - Graffiti Bridge, written by Prince
  - Rocky V, written by Sylvester Stallone
- 1991 Hudson Hawk, screenplay by Steven E. de Souza and Daniel Waters, story by Bruce Willis and Robert Kraft
  - Cool as Ice, written by David Stenn
  - Dice Rules, concert material written by Andrew Dice Clay; "A Day in the Life" written by Lenny Schulman, story by Clay
  - Nothing but Trouble, screenplay by Dan Aykroyd, story by Peter Aykroyd
  - Return to the Blue Lagoon, screenplay by Leslie Stevens, based on the novel "The Garden of God" by Henry de Vere Stacpoole
- 1992 Stop! Or My Mom Will Shoot, written by Blake Snyder, William Osborne & William Davies
  - The Bodyguard, written by Lawrence Kasdan
  - Christopher Columbus: The Discovery, screenplay by John Briley and Cary Bates and Mario Puzo
  - Final Analysis, screenplay by Wesley Strick, story by Robert H. Berger, M.D. (consultant), and Wesley Strick
  - Shining Through, written for the screen by David Seltzer, based on the novel by Susan Isaacs
- 1993 Indecent Proposal, screenplay by Amy Holden Jones, based upon the novel by Jack Engelhard
  - Body of Evidence, written by Brad Mirman (listed as "not based on the novel by Patricia Cornwell")
  - Cliffhanger, screenplay by Michael France and Sylvester Stallone, screen story by France, based on a premise by John Long
  - Last Action Hero, screenplay by Shane Black & David Arnott, story by Zak Penn & Adam Leff
  - Sliver, screenplay by Joe Eszterhas, based on the novel by Ira Levin
- 1994 The Flintstones, screenplay by Tom S. Parker, Jim Jennewein, Steven E. de Souza, Al Aidekman, Kate Barker, Cindy Begel, Ruth Bennett, Bruce Cohen, Robert Conte, Rob Dames, Lon Diamond, Michael J. Di Gaetano, Fred Fox Jr., Lowell Ganz, Lloyd Garver, Daniel Goldin, Joshua Goldin, Richard Gurman, Jason Hoffs, Brian Levant, Babaloo Mandel, Mitch Markowitz, Ron Osborn, Jeff Reno, David Richardson, Leonard Ripps, Gary Ross, Dava Savel, David Silverman, Nancy Steen, Stephen Sustarsic, Roy Teicher, Neil Thompson, Michael J. Wilson, and Peter Martin Wortmann, based on the television series created by William Hanna and Joseph Barbera (Steven E. de Souza and the team of Tom S. Parker & Jim Jennewein were the only "winners" credited in the film; the other 32 recipients all wrote drafts of the screenplay.)
  - Color of Night, screenplay by Matthew Chapman and Billy Ray, story by Ray
  - Milk Money, written by John Mattson
  - North, screenplay by Alan Zweibel and Andrew Scheinman, from the novel by Zweibel
  - On Deadly Ground, written by Ed Horowitz & Robin Russin
- 1995 Showgirls, written by Joe Eszterhas
  - Congo, screenplay by John Patrick Shanley, based on the novel by Michael Crichton
  - It's Pat, written by Jim Emerson & Stephen Hibbert & Julia Sweeney, based on characters created by Sweeney
  - Jade, written by Joe Eszterhas
  - The Scarlet Letter, screenplay by Douglas Day Stewart, freely adapted from the novel by Nathaniel Hawthorne
- 1996 Striptease, screenplay by Andrew Bergman, based on the novel by Carl Hiaasen
  - Barb Wire, screenplay by Chuck Pfarrer and Ilene Chaiken, story by Chaiken, based upon the characters appearing in the Dark Horse comic
  - Ed, screenplay by David Mickey Evans, story by Ken Richards and Janus Cercone
  - The Island of Dr. Moreau, screenplay by Richard Stanley and Ron Hutchinson, based on the novel by H. G. Wells
  - The Stupids, screenplay by Brent Forrester, based on a series of books by James Marshall and Harry Allard
- 1997 The Postman, screenplay by Eric Roth and Brian Helgeland, based on the novel by David Brin
  - Anaconda, written by Hans Bauer and Jim Cash & Jack Epps Jr.
  - Batman & Robin, screenplay by Akiva Goldsman, based on the DC Comics characters created by Bob Kane
  - The Lost World: Jurassic Park, screenplay by David Koepp, based on the novel by Michael Crichton
  - Speed 2: Cruise Control, screenplay by Randall McCormick and Jeff Nathanson, story by Jan de Bont and McCormick, based on characters created by Graham Yost
- 1998 An Alan Smithee Film: Burn Hollywood Burn, written by Joe Eszterhas
  - Armageddon, screenplay by Jonathan Hensleigh and J. J. Abrams, story by Robert Roy Pool and Jonathan Hensleigh, adaptation by Tony Gilroy and Shane Salerno
  - The Avengers, screenplay by Don Macpherson, based on the television series created by Sydney Newman
  - Godzilla, screenplay by Dean Devlin and Roland Emmerich, story by Ted Elliot, Terry Rossio, Dean Devlin and Roland Emmerich, based on the Godzilla character created by Toho
  - Spice World, written by Kim Fuller, idea by Fuller and the Spice Girls
- 1999 Wild Wild West, story by Jim Thomas & John Thomas, screenplay by S. S. Wilson, Brent Maddock, Jeffrey Price and Peter S. Seaman, based on the television series created by Michael Garrison
  - Big Daddy, screenplay by Steve Franks and Tim Herlihy & Adam Sandler
  - The Haunting, screenplay by David Self, based on the novel The Haunting of Hill House by Shirley Jackson
  - The Mod Squad, screenplay by Stephen Kay & Scott Silver and Kate Lanier, based on the television series created by Bud Ruskin
  - Star Wars: Episode I – The Phantom Menace, written by George Lucas

== 2000s ==
- 2000 Battlefield Earth, screenplay by Corey Mandell and J. David Shapiro, based on the novel by L. Ron Hubbard
  - Book of Shadows: Blair Witch 2, written by Dick Beebe and Joe Berlinger
  - How the Grinch Stole Christmas, screenplay by Jeffrey Price and Peter S. Seaman, based on the book by Dr. Seuss
  - Little Nicky, written by Tim Herlihy, Adam Sandler and Steven Brill
  - The Next Best Thing, written by Tom Ropelewski
- 2001 Freddy Got Fingered, written by Tom Green & Derek Harvie
  - Driven, written by Sylvester Stallone, Jan Skrentny and Neal Tabachnick
  - Glitter, screenplay by Kate Lanier and Cheryl West
  - Pearl Harbor, written by Randall Wallace
  - 3000 Miles to Graceland, written by Richard Recco and Demian Lichtenstein
- 2002 Star Wars: Episode II – Attack of the Clones, screenplay by George Lucas and Jonathan Hales
  - The Adventures of Pluto Nash, written by Neil Cuthbert
  - Crossroads, screenplay by Shonda Rhimes
  - Pinocchio, screenplay by Vincenzo Cerami and Roberto Benigni, based on the novel by Carlo Collodi
  - Swept Away, screenplay by Guy Ritchie
- 2003 Gigli, written by Martin Brest
  - The Cat in the Hat, screenplay by Alec Berg, David Mandel and Jeff Schaffer, based on the book by Dr. Seuss
  - Charlie's Angels: Full Throttle, screenplay by John August and Marianne Wibberley & Cormac Wibberley
  - Dumb and Dumberer: When Harry Met Lloyd, screenplay by Robert Brener and Troy Miller, based on characters created by Peter Farrelly, Bennett Yellin and Bobby Farrelly
  - From Justin to Kelly, written by Kim Fuller
- 2004 Catwoman, written by Theresa Rebeck and John Brancato & Michael Ferris and John Rogers
  - Alexander, written by Oliver Stone and Christopher Kyle and Laeta Kalogridis
  - Superbabies: Baby Geniuses 2, story by Steven Paul, screenplay by Gregory Poppen
  - Surviving Christmas, written by Deborah Kaplan & Harry Elfont and Jeffrey Ventimilia & Joshua Sternin
  - White Chicks, written by Keenen Ivory & Shawn & Marlon Wayans and Andy McElfresh, Michael Anthony Snowden and Xavier Cook
- 2005 Dirty Love, written by Jenny McCarthy
  - Bewitched, screenplay by Nora Ephron, Delia Ephron and Adam McKay, based on the television series created by Sol Saks
  - Deuce Bigalow: European Gigolo, written by Rob Schneider, David Garrett and Jason Ward
  - The Dukes of Hazzard, screenplay by John O'Brien, based on the television series created by Gy Waldron
  - Son of the Mask, written by Lance Khazei
- 2006 Basic Instinct 2, screenplay by Leora Barish and Henry Bean, based on characters created by Joe Eszterhas
  - BloodRayne, screenplay by Guinevere Turner, based on the video game
  - Lady in the Water, written by M. Night Shyamalan
  - Little Man, written by Keenen Ivory Wayans, Marlon Wayans and Shawn Wayans
  - The Wicker Man, screenplay adapted by Neil LaBute from an earlier screenplay by Anthony Shaffer
- 2007 I Know Who Killed Me, written by Jeffrey Hammond
  - Daddy Day Camp, screenplay by Geoff Rodkey, David J. Stem & David N. Weiss
  - Epic Movie, written by Jason Friedberg and Aaron Seltzer
  - I Now Pronounce You Chuck & Larry, screenplay by Barry Fanaro, Alexander Payne & Jim Taylor
  - Norbit, screenplay by Eddie Murphy & Charlie Murphy and Jay Sherick & David Ronn
- 2008 The Love Guru, written by Mike Myers & Graham Gordy
  - Disaster Movie and Meet the Spartans (jointly), written by Jason Friedberg and Aaron Seltzer
  - The Happening, written by M. Night Shyamalan
  - The Hottie & the Nottie, written by Heidi Ferrer
  - In the Name of the King, screenplay by Doug Taylor
- 2009 Transformers: Revenge of the Fallen, screenplay by Ehren Kruger, Alex Kurtzman and Roberto Orci, based on Hasbro's Transformers toys
  - All About Steve, written by Kim Barker
  - G.I. Joe: The Rise of Cobra, screenplay by Stuart Beattie, David Elliot and Paul Lovett, based on Hasbro's G.I. Joe characters
  - Land of the Lost, screenplay by Chris Henchy and Dennis McNicholas, based on the television series created by Sid and Marty Krofft
  - The Twilight Saga: New Moon, screenplay by Melissa Rosenberg, based on the novel by Stephenie Meyer

== 2010s ==
- 2010 The Last Airbender – screenplay by M. Night Shyamalan, based on the television series created by Michael Dante DiMartino and Bryan Konietzko
  - Little Fockers – screenplay by John Hamburg and Larry Stuckey, based on characters created by Greg Glienna and Mary Ruth Clarke
  - Sex and the City 2 – screenplay by Michael Patrick King, based on the television series created by Darren Star
  - The Twilight Saga: Eclipse – screenplay by Melissa Rosenberg, based on the novel by Stephenie Meyer
  - Vampires Suck – written by Jason Friedberg and Aaron Seltzer
- 2011 Jack and Jill – screenplay by Steve Koren and Adam Sandler, story by Ben Zook
  - Bucky Larson: Born to Be a Star – written by Adam Sandler, Allen Covert and Nick Swardson
  - New Year's Eve – written by Katherine Fugate
  - Transformers: Dark of the Moon – screenplay by Ehren Kruger, based on Hasbro's "Transformers" toys
  - The Twilight Saga: Breaking Dawn – Part 1 – screenplay by Melissa Rosenberg, based on the novel by Stephenie Meyer
- 2012 That's My Boy – written by David Caspe
  - Atlas Shrugged: Part II – screenplay by Duke Sandefur, Brian Patrick O'Toole and Duncan Scott, based on the novel by Ayn Rand
  - Battleship – screenplay by Jon and Erich Hoeber, based on the boardgame by Hasbro
  - A Thousand Words – written by Steve Koren
  - The Twilight Saga: Breaking Dawn – Part 2 – screenplay by Melissa Rosenberg and Stephenie Meyer, based on the novel by Meyer
- 2013 Movie 43 – written by Rocky Russo, Jeremy Sosenko, Ricky Blitt, Bill O'Malley, Will Graham, Jack Kukoda, Matthew Alec Portenoy, Claes Kjellstrom, Jonas Wittenmark, Tobias Carlson, Will Carlough, Jonathan van Tulleken, Elizabeth Wright Shapiro, Olle Sarri, Jacob Fleisher, Greg Pritikin, James Gunn and Bob Odenkirk
  - After Earth – screenplay by M. Night Shyamalan and Gary Whitta, story by Will Smith
  - Grown Ups 2 – screenplay by Adam Sandler, Tim Herlihy and Fred Wolf
  - The Lone Ranger – screenplay by Justin Haythe, Ted Elliott and Terry Rossio, story by Ted Elliott, Terry Rossio and Justin Haythe, based on the character by Fran Striker and George W. Trendle
  - A Madea Christmas – written by Tyler Perry
- 2014 Saving Christmas – written by Darren Doane and Cheston Hervey
  - Left Behind – screenplay by Paul LaLonde and John Patus, based on the novel by Tim LaHaye and Jerry B. Jenkins
  - Sex Tape – screenplay by Kate Angelo, Jason Segel and Nicholas Stoller, story by Kate Angelo
  - Teenage Mutant Ninja Turtles – screenplay by Evan Daugherty, André Nemec and Josh Appelbaum, based on characters created by Peter Laird and Kevin Eastman
  - Transformers: Age of Extinction – screenplay by Ehren Kruger, based on Hasbro's "Transformers" toys
- 2015 Fifty Shades of Grey – screenplay by Kelly Marcel, based on the novel by E. L. James
  - Fantastic Four – screenplay by Jeremy Slater, Simon Kinberg and Josh Trank, based on the Marvel Comics characters created by Stan Lee and Jack Kirby
  - Jupiter Ascending – written by The Wachowskis
  - Paul Blart: Mall Cop 2 – written by Nick Bakay and Kevin James
  - Pixels – screenplay by Tim Herlihy and Timothy Dowling, story by Tim Herlihy, based on the short film by Patrick Jean
- 2016 Batman v Superman: Dawn of Justice – screenplay by Chris Terrio and David S. Goyer, based on characters created by DC Comics
  - Dirty Grandpa – written by John M. Phillips
  - Gods of Egypt – written by Matt Sazama and Burk Sharpless
  - Hillary's America: The Secret History of the Democratic Party – written by Dinesh D'Souza and Bruce Schooley
  - Independence Day: Resurgence – screenplay by Nicolas Wright, James A. Woods, Dean Devlin, Roland Emmerich and James Vanderbilt, story by Dean Devlin, Roland Emmerich, Nicolas Wright and James A. Woods
  - Suicide Squad – screenplay by David Ayer, based on characters created by DC Comics
- 2017 The Emoji Movie – screenplay by Tony Leondis, Eric Siegel and Mike White, story by Tony Leondis and Eric Siegel
  - Baywatch – screenplay by Mark Swift and Damian Shannon, story by Jay Scherick, David Ronn, Thomas Lennon and Robert Ben Garant, based on the television series created by Michael Berk, Douglas Schwartz and Gregory J. Bonann
  - Fifty Shades Darker – screenplay by Niall Leonard, based on the novel by E. L. James
  - The Mummy – screenplay by David Koepp, Christopher McQuarrie and Dylan Kussman, story by Jon Spaihts, Alex Kurtzman and Jenny Lumet, based on The Mummy franchise
  - Transformers: The Last Knight – screenplay by Art Marcum and Matt Holloway and Ken Nolan, story by Akiva Goldsman, Art Marcum, Matt Holloway and Ken Nolan, based on Hasbro's "Transformers" toys
- 2018 Fifty Shades Freed – screenplay by Niall Leonard, based on the novel by E. L. James
  - Death of a Nation – screenplay by Dinesh D'Souza and Bruce Schooley, based on The Big Lie and Death of a Nation by Dinesh D'Souza
  - Gotti – written by Lem Dobbs and Leo Rossi
  - The Happytime Murders – screenplay by Todd Berger, story by Todd Berger and Dee Austin Robertson
  - Winchester – screenplay by Tom Vaughan and The Spierig Brothers
- 2019 Cats – screenplay by Lee Hall and Tom Hooper; based on the musical by Andrew Lloyd Webber, which was based on Old Possum's Book of Practical Cats by T. S. Eliot
  - The Haunting of Sharon Tate – written by Daniel Farrands
  - Hellboy – screenplay by Andrew Cosby; based on the Dark Horse Comics character by Mike Mignola
  - A Madea Family Funeral – written by Tyler Perry
  - Rambo: Last Blood – screenplay by Matthew Cirulnick and Sylvester Stallone; based on the character created by David Morrell

== 2020s ==
- 2020 – 365 Days – screenplay by Tomasz Klimala, Barbara Bialowas, Tomasz Mandes and Blanka Lipińska; based on the novel by Lipińska
  - Corona Zombies, Barbie & Kendra Save the Tiger King and Barbie & Kendra Storm Area 51 – written by Kent Roudebush, Silvia St. Croix and Billy Butler
  - Dolittle – screenplay by Stephen Gaghan, Dan Gregor and Doug Mand, story by Thomas Shepherd; based on a series of books by Hugh Lofting
  - Fantasy Island – screenplay by Jeff Wadlow, Chris Roach and Jillian Jacobs; based on the television series created by Gene Levitt
  - Hillbilly Elegy – screenplay by Vanessa Taylor, based on the memoir by JD Vance
- 2021 – Diana the Musical – screenplay by Joe DiPietro; music and lyrics by David Bryan and DiPietro
  - Karen – written by "Coke" Daniels
  - The Misfits – screenplay by Robert Henny and Kurt Wimmer; screen story by Robert Henny
  - Twist – written by Sally Collett and John Wrathall; additional material by Tom Grass, Kevin Lehane, Michael Lindley, and Matthew Parkhill (from an "Original Idea" by David T. Lynch, Keith Lynch, and Simon Thomas)
  - The Woman in the Window – screenplay by Tracy Letts, based on the novel by A. J. Finn
- 2022 – Blonde – screenplay by Andrew Dominik; based on the novel by Joyce Carol Oates
  - Disney's Pinocchio – screenplay by Robert Zemeckis and Chris Weitz; based on the 1940 Disney animated film and the novel The Adventures of Pinocchio by Carlo Collodi
  - Good Mourning – written by Machine Gun Kelly and Mod Sun
  - Jurassic World Dominion – screenplay by Emily Carmichael and Colin Trevorrow; story by Colin Trevorrow and Derek Connolly; based on characters by Michael Crichton
  - Morbius – screen story and screenplay by Matt Sazama and Burk Sharpless; based on characters by Marvel Comics
- 2023 – Winnie-the-Pooh: Blood and Honey – screenplay by Rhys Frake-Waterfield; "based" on the book by A.A. Milne
  - The Exorcist: Believer – screenplay by David Gordon Green and Peter Sattler; story by Scott Teems, Danny McBride and David Gordon Green; based on the novel by William Peter Blatty
  - Expend4bles – screenplay by Kurt Wimmer, Tad Daggerhart and Max D. Adams; story by Spenser Cohen, Kurt Wimmer, and Tad Daggerhart; based on the franchise by David Callaham
  - Indiana Jones and the Dial of Destiny – screenplay by Jez Butterworth, John-Henry Butterworth, David Koepp, and James Mangold; based on the franchise by George Lucas and Philip Kaufman
  - Shazam! Fury of the Gods – screenplay by Henry Gayden and Chris Morgan; based on characters by DC Comics
- 2024 – Madame Web – screenplay by Matt Sazama, Burk Sharpless, Claire Parker, and S. J. Clarkson; story by Kerem Sanga, Matt Sazama, and Burk Sharpless; based on characters by Marvel Comics
  - Joker: Folie à Deux – screenplay by Scott Silver and Todd Phillips; based on characters by DC Comics
  - Kraven the Hunter – screenplay by Art Marcum, Matt Holloway, and Richard Wenk; story by Richard Wenk; based on characters by Marvel Comics
  - Megalopolis – written by Francis Ford Coppola
  - Reagan – screenplay by Howard Klausner; based on the book The Crusader: Ronald Reagan and the Fall of Communism by Paul Kengor
- 2025 - War of the Worlds – screen story and screenplay by Kenny Golde and screenplay by Marc Hyman, adapting (or destroying) the classic novel by H. G. Wells
  - The Electric State – screenplay by Christopher Markus and Stephen McFeely, based on the novel by Simon Stålenhag
  - Hurry Up Tomorrow – screenplay by Trey Edward Shults, Abel Tesfaye, and Reza Fahim
  - Snow White – screenplay by Erin Cressida Wilson, based on the original fairy tale by the Brothers Grimm
  - Star Trek: Section 31 – screenplay by Craig Sweeny, story by Bo Yeon Kim and Erika Lippoldt

== Multiple winners ==
2 wins

- Steven E. de Souza
- Daniel Waters
- Joe Eszterhas

== Multiple nominations ==
9 nominations

- Sylvester Stallone

5 nominations

- Joe Eszterhas
- Adam Sandler

4 nominations

- Tim Herlihy
- Melissa Rosenberg
- M. Night Shyamalan

3 nominations

- Jason Friedberg
- David Koepp
- George Lucas
- Matt Sazama
- Aaron Seltzer
- Burk Sharpless
- Ehren Kruger

2 nominations

- David Arnott
- Michael Cimino
- Dinesh D'Souza
- John Derek
- Dean Devlin
- Ted Elliott
- Roland Emmerich
- Akiva Goldsman
- Steve Koren
- Alex Kurtzman
- Niall Leonard
- Eddie Murphy
- Tyler Perry
- Terry Rossio
- Scott Silver
- Steven E. de Souza
- Oliver Stone
- Daniel Waters
- Keenen Ivory Wayans
- Marlon Wayans
- Shawn Wayans
- Kurt Wimmer
