= 88 Minutes =

2007 film

- Theatrical release poster
- Directed by: Jon Avnet
- Written by: Gary Scott Thompson
- Produced by: Jon Avnet; Randall Emmett; Gary Scott Thompson
- Starring: Al Pacino; Alicia Witt; Leelee Sobieski; Amy Brenneman; Deborah Kara Unger; Benjamin McKenzie; Neal McDonough
- Cinematography: Denis Lenoir
- Edited by: Peter Berger
- Music by: Edward Shearmur
- Production companies: TriStar Pictures; Millennium Films; Nu Image; Emmett/Furla Films; Brightlight Pictures; Family Room Entertainment; Brooklyn Films
- Distributed by: Sony Pictures Releasing (North America); Millennium Films (Overseas)
- Release dates: March 2, 2007 (Israel); April 18, 2008 (United States)
- Running time: 110 minutes
- Countries: United States; Canada; Germany
- Language: English
- Budget: $30 million
- Box office: $32.6 million

88 Minutes is a 2007 thriller film directed by Jon Avnet and starring Al Pacino, Alicia Witt, Leelee Sobieski, William Forsythe, Deborah Kara Unger, Amy Brenneman, Neal McDonough and Benjamin McKenzie. In the film, famed forensic psychiatrist Dr. Jack Gramm (Pacino) is one of the most sought-after profilers in the world. His expert testimony resulted in the conviction of serial killer Jon Forster (McDonough). However, on the eve of Forster's execution, one of Gramm's students is murdered in a vicious copycat crime, and Gramm receives an ominous message informing him that he has 88 minutes to live. Released on March 2, 2007, in Israel, and in the United States on April 18, 2008, 88 Minutes underperformed at the box office, grossing $32.6 million against a $30 million budget, and was panned by critics.

== Plot ==
In 1997, forensic psychiatrist Dr. Jack Gramm testifies at the trial of suspected serial killer Jon Forster. Gramm's testimony and expert psychiatric opinion are crucial in Forster's conviction for the attempted killing of Janie Cates and the murder of her twin sister Joanie, who was drugged with halothane, hanged upside down and killed after the murderer invaded the sisters' apartment. After receiving a guilty verdict from the jury, Forster taunts Gramm, saying, "Tick-tock, Doc."

Nine years later, as Forster's execution date approaches, several similar torture murders occur. Gramm, now teaching at the University of Washington, is questioned by a lawyer from the Attorney General's office, as well as FBI Special Agent Frank Parks. The latest victim, Dale Morris, is revealed to be a former psychology student of Gramm's; they attended the same party on the previous night. On the way to his class, Gramm receives a phone call from someone using a voice changer, informing him that he has eighty-eight minutes to live. He reports the call to his secretary Shelly, asking for a risk assessment profile of suspects.

Gramm receives another phone threat while teaching and becomes suspicious of his students, particularly Mike Stempt. The dean of students, Carol Johnson, interrupts the class to report a bomb threat. While evacuating, Gramm finds threats written on both the classroom's overhead projector and his car, which has been vandalized in the parking garage. Gramm is met by his teaching assistant, Kim Cummings, who offers to help find the perpetrator. In the stairwell, Gramm encounters one of his students, Lauren Douglas, attacked by an unknown assailant, and reports the assault to campus security.

Gramm and Kim go to his condo, where a package has been delivered. The package contains an audiotape of Gramm's sister Kate many years earlier, crying for help before being murdered. Gramm concludes that someone accessed his secure files to obtain the tape. Kim's ex-husband Guy LaForge appears with a gun at the apartment but is shot and killed from behind by an assailant masked by a motorcycle helmet. A sudden onset of smoke triggers the fire alarm, and the shooter flees through the crowd outside. Shortly after, Gramm's car explodes, having been rigged with a bomb.

Renting a cab, Gramm explains to Kim that his sister was killed decades earlier when he left her alone in his apartment; the crime took exactly eighty-eight minutes. Next, Gramm and Kim visit Sara Pollard, a woman whom Gramm slept with the night before, but find her murdered in her apartment, with evidence incriminating Gramm. Carol calls Gramm and makes comments suggesting that she is the killer, demanding that Gramm meet her at his office. Shelly arrives at Sara's apartment and advises Gramm that she suspects that Lauren was the one who stole the audiotape of Kate's death. Kim disappears from the apartment and calls Gramm with a threat similar to Carol's, also demanding that he meet her at the office.

Through prison visitation records, Gramm deduces that Forster's appeals attorney, "Lydia Doherty," is a pseudonym for Lauren, surmising that she arranged the frame with orders from Forster. Kim calls again, instructing Gramm to come to another nearby location on campus, where he finds Carol bleeding and hanging by one leg over a seventh-floor balcony; Kim is tied up and gagged nearby, held at gunpoint by Lauren.

Lauren forces Gramm to "confess" on tape that he gave false testimony at Forster's trial. Special Agent Parks arrives and shoots Lauren, causing both Carol and Lauren to partially fall from the balcony. Gramm saves Carol from completing the fall, but Lauren comes loose and plummets to her death. When Forster calls asking to speak with Lauren, Gramm informs him of Lauren's death. He quips, "Tick-tock, tick-tock, you got twelve hours to live," before throwing the phone, smashing it. Gramm flashes back to interactions with Kate and Janie Cates, and pockets the device that recorded his "confession." He shares knowing glances with Parks and Kim before walking away.

== Cast ==
- Al Pacino as Dr. Jack Gramm
- Alicia Witt as Kim Cummings
- Leelee Sobieski as Lauren Douglas / Lydia Doherty
- Amy Brenneman as Shelly Barnes
- William Forsythe as FBI Special Agent Frank Parks
- Deborah Kara Unger as Carol Johnson
- Benjamin McKenzie as Mike Stempt
- Neal McDonough as Jon Forster
- Leah Cairns as Sara Pollard
- Stephen Moyer as Guy LaForge
- Christopher Redman as Jeremy Guber
- Brendan Fletcher as Johnny D'Franco
- Michael Eklund as J.T. Rycker
- Trilby Glover as Defense Attorney Bennett
- Carrie Genzel as Stephanie Parkman
- Kristina Copeland as Dale Morris
- Tammy Hui as Janie Cates
- Vicky Huang as Joanie Cates
- Victoria Tennant II as Kate
- Michal Yannai as Leeza Pearson
- Paul Campbell as Albert Jackson

== Production ==
In January 2000, it was reported that Touchstone Pictures had acquired a pitch from Gary Scott Thompson titled 88 Minutes, centered on a man who receives a phone call telling him he has 88 minutes to live, sending him on a desperate search for who is trying to kill him, with Lawrence Bender and John Baldecchi producing. Prior to being acquired by Touchstone, the pitch was submitted to 20th Century Fox and Miramax who both rejected it. In May 2004, it was reported that Emmett/Furla Oasis would finance and produce the film with James Foley and Al Pacino set to direct and star respectively while Millennium Media would handle distribution. In July 2005, it was reported that Jon Avnet would direct after delays in the project forced Foley to drop out.

Filming began in the Vancouver area on October 8, 2005, and completed in December 2005.

In 2007, the film was released in various European countries. In May 2007, Sony Pictures Worldwide Acquisitions Group paid $6 million to acquire North American and select international distribution rights of 88 Minutes. The group theatrically released the film in the United States on April 18, 2008, through TriStar Pictures.

== Reception ==
=== Box office ===
In its opening weekend, the film grossed $7 million in 2,168 theaters in the United States and Canada, ranking fourth at the box office, averaging $3,209 per theater. In its second weekend, the film grossed $3.6 million and fell to number eight at the box office. The film grossed $17.2 million at the US and Canadian box office, and $15.4 million internationally, for a worldwide gross of $32.6 million.

=== Critical response ===
On the review aggregator website Rotten Tomatoes, 5% of 122 critics' reviews are positive, with an average rating of 2.9/10. The website's consensus reads: "88 Minutes is a shockingly inept psychological thriller that expertly squanders the talent at hand." Metacritic, which uses a weighted average, assigned the film a score of 17 out of 100, based on 27 critics, indicating "overwhelming dislike". Audiences polled by CinemaScore gave the film an average grade of "B–" on a scale of A+ to F.

The film received two nominations at the 29th Golden Raspberry Awards: Worst Actor for Al Pacino (and for Righteous Kill, also directed by Avnet) and Worst Supporting Actress for Leelee Sobieski (and for In the Name of the King), but lost to Mike Myers for The Love Guru and Paris Hilton for Repo! The Genetic Opera, respectively.

=== Home media ===
88 Minutes was released on DVD on September 16, 2008, and sold 220,965 in the opening weekend. After seven weeks, it had sold 574,041 units, with a gathered revenue of $11,150,056, or more than one-third of the budget.

== Remake ==
In May 2013, Original Entertainment confirmed that it sealed a five-picture deal with Millennium Films to produce Bollywood remakes of Rambo, The Expendables, 16 Blocks, 88 Minutes and Brooklyn's Finest, with the productions for Rambo and The Expendables expected to start at the end of that year.
