= 29th Golden Raspberry Awards =

Award ceremony presented by the Golden Raspberry Award Foundation in 2008

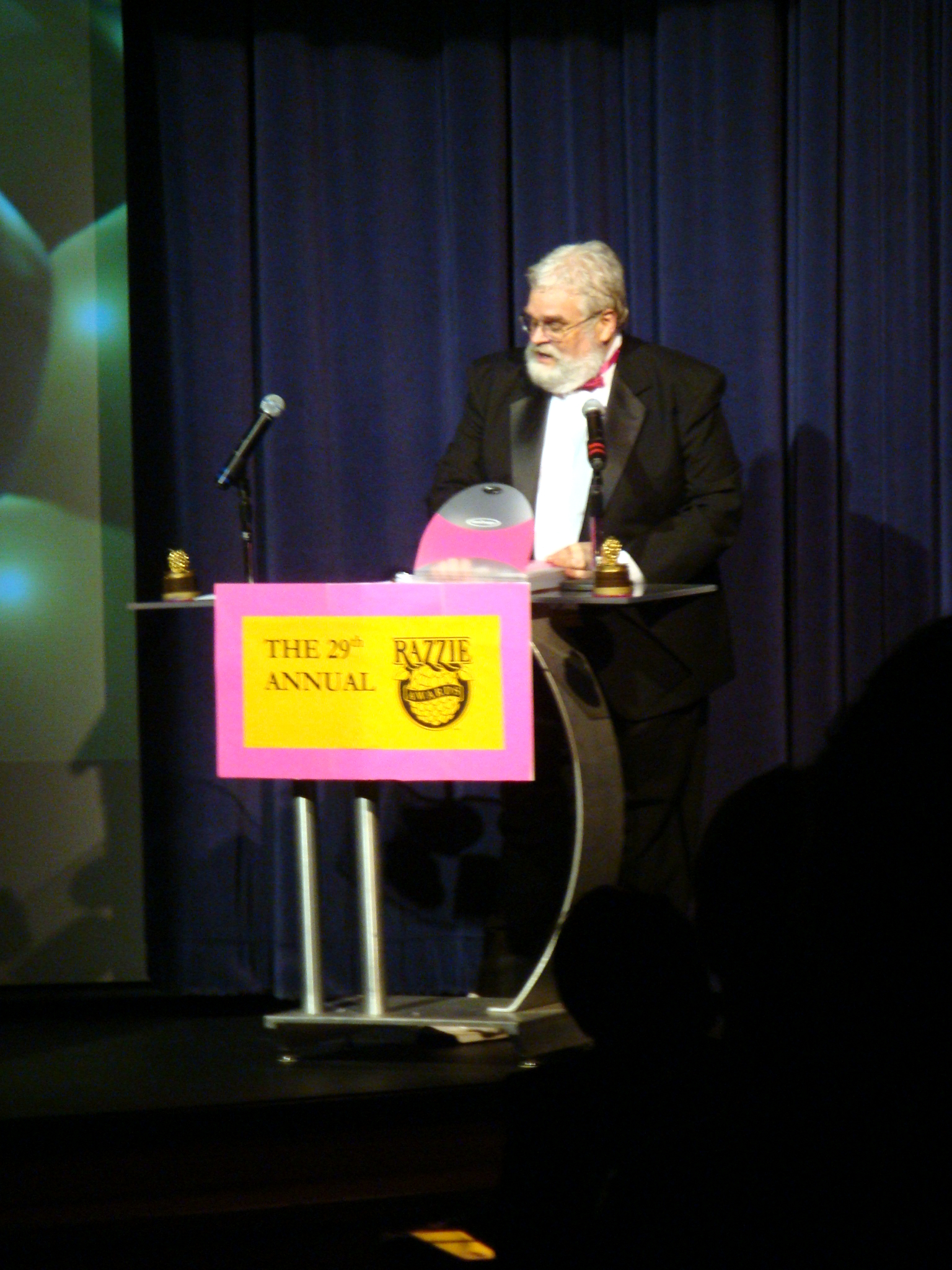
- John Wilson at the 29th Golden Raspberry Awards
- Date: February 21, 2009
- Site: Barnsdall Gallery Theatre, Hollywood, California

Highlights
- Worst Picture: The Love Guru
- Most awards: The Love Guru (3)
- Most nominations: The Love Guru (7)

The 29th Golden Raspberry Awards, or Razzies, ceremony was held by the Golden Raspberry Award Foundation to identify the worst films the film industry had to offer in 2008, according to votes from members of the Golden Raspberry Foundation. Razzies co-founder John J. B. Wilson has stated that the intent of the awards is "to be funny." The ceremony was held at the Barnsdall Gallery Theatre in Hollywood, California on February 21, 2009. Nominations were announced on January 21, 2009. The Love Guru was the most nominated film of 2008, with seven. Award results were based on votes from approximately 650 journalists, cinema fans and film professionals from 20 countries. Awards were presented by John Wilson, the ceremony's founder. The Love Guru received the most awards, winning Worst Picture, Worst Actor, and Worst Screenplay. Paris Hilton received three awards, including Worst Actress for her work in The Hottie & the Nottie and Worst Supporting Actress for Repo! The Genetic Opera. Hilton matched the record number of awards received by an actor in a single year, set by Eddie Murphy the previous year at the 28th Golden Raspberry Awards for his roles in Norbit.

Pierce Brosnan received Worst Supporting Actor for his role in Mamma Mia!, and Indiana Jones and the Kingdom of the Crystal Skull received the award for Worst Prequel, Remake, Rip-off or Sequel. Uwe Boll received the Worst Director award for the films 1968 Tunnel Rats, In the Name of the King and Postal, and also received a special award for Worst Career Achievement.

Nominations were announced on January 21, 2009, one day before the 81st Academy Awards nominations, and according to Razzies tradition the ceremony itself also preceded the corresponding Academy Award function by one day. The most nominated film of 2008 was the box office bomb The Love Guru, with seven nominations. Paid members of the Golden Raspberry Award Foundation voted to determine the winners; individuals may become members of the foundation by visiting the organization's website at www.razzies.com. Award results were based on votes from approximately 650 journalists, cinema fans and professionals from the film industry. Voters were from 45 states in the United States and 19 other countries.

== Ceremony ==
The ceremony opened with a musical number which parodied the song "Dancing Queen" from Mamma Mia! The Movie. Awards were presented by John Wilson, the ceremony's founder. Awardees received a gold spray-painted raspberry worth $4.97. The Love Guru received three awards: Worst Picture, Worst Actor and Worst Screenplay. Worst Picture was the last award given out at the ceremony. John Wilson did not agree with the voters' determination on The Love Guru, and after viewing the film again in preparation for the ceremony, said to the Associated Press: "A couple of things he did got me to laugh, and these days, two laughs in a comedy is a high ratio." "The main thing wrong with it is no one said to Myers that it wasn't funny. He managed to offend the entire Indian population and his investors," said Wilson in a statement in The Guardian. Wilson shredded a copy of The Love Guru at the awards ceremony.

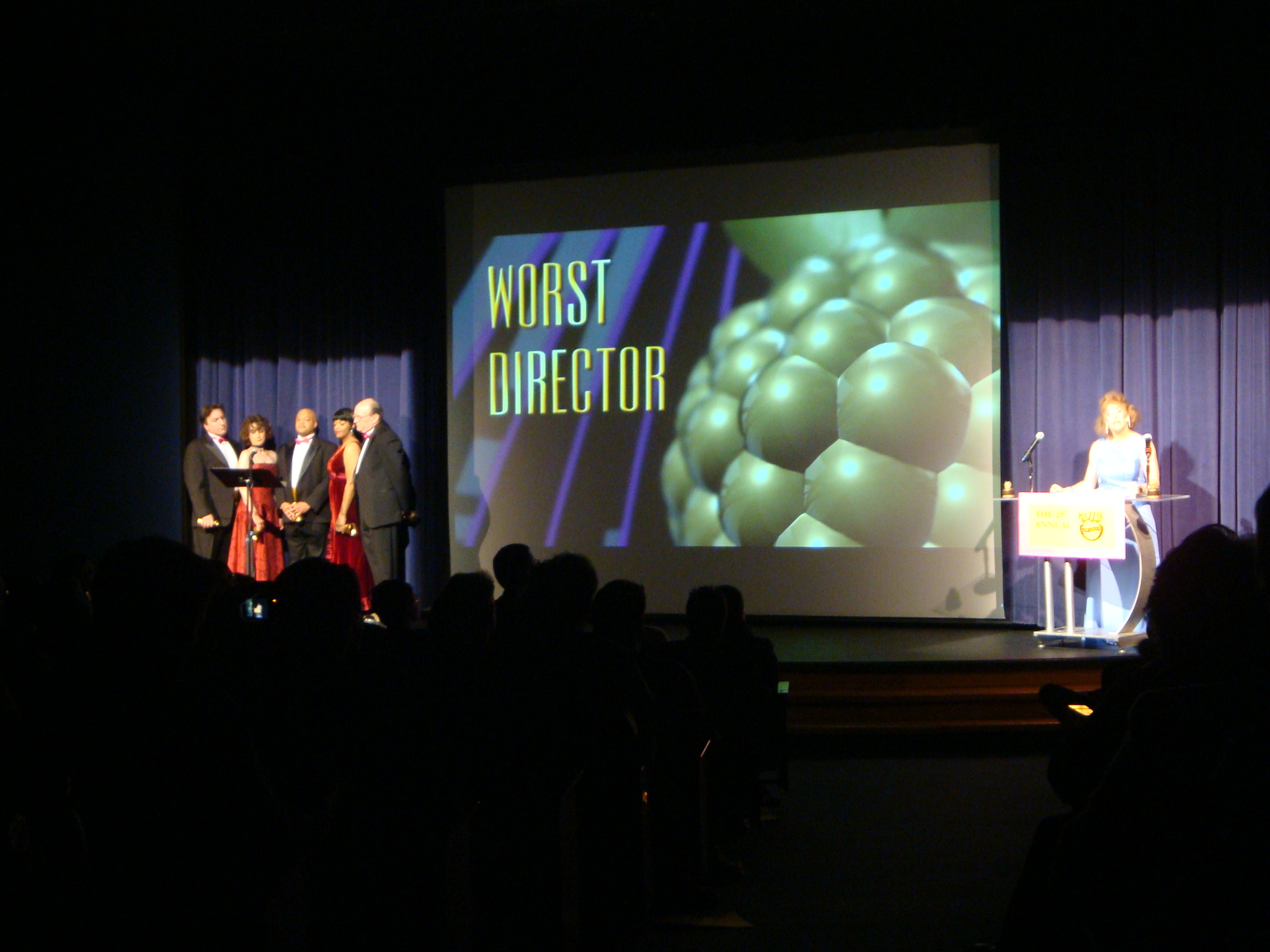
Presentation of Worst Director at 29th Golden Raspberry Awards

Paris Hilton's acting roles brought her three awards: Worst Actress and as part of Worst Screen Couple (with either Christine Lakin or Joel David Moore) for her performance in The Hottie & the Nottie, and Worst Supporting Actress for her work in Repo! The Genetic Opera. Hilton matched the record number of awards received by an actor in a single year, set by Eddie Murphy the previous year at the 28th Golden Raspberry Awards; he received three awards from different categories for the multiple characters he played in Norbit. "She is the 21st century Zsa Zsa Gabor. She is famous for who she hangs out with. She's not famous for any talent she has yet exhibited. She may end up working with Uwe Boll. She could be the head vampire in 'BloodRayne 3'," said Wilson of Hilton's performances. Pierce Brosnan received Worst Supporting Actor for his role in Mamma Mia! The Movie. Award hosts Chip Dornell and Kelie McIver described Brosnan as "an actor who could not sing, should not sing and arguably did not sing, in a role he should not have accepted." The Steven Spielberg film Indiana Jones and the Kingdom of the Crystal Skull received the award for Worst Prequel, Remake, Rip-off or Sequel.

Uwe Boll received the Worst Director award for films 1968 Tunnel Rats, In the Name of the King and Postal. He also received a special award for Worst Career Achievement. Boll was dubbed by award organizers as "Germany's answer to Ed Wood", a reference to Plan 9 from Outer Space film director Ed Wood Boll sent a humorous videotaped speech from a mock set of Darfur, Sudan, stating he would not return because the Razzie awards had "ruined his life". Wilson commented to Agence France-Presse: "Uwe Boll is the world-class movie director – anything he does is awful. He was the overwhelming choice to receive our career achievement award."

== Winners and nominees ==
Winner (in bold)

Category	Image	Recipient
Worst Picture		**The Love Guru (Paramount)**
Worst Picture		Disaster Movie (Lionsgate) and Meet the Spartans (20th Century Fox) (jointly)
Worst Picture		The Happening (20th Century Fox)
Worst Picture		The Hottie and the Nottie (Regent/Summit)
Worst Picture		In the Name of the King (Boll KG/Brightlight Pictures)
Worst Actor	Mike Myers	**Mike Myers in The Love Guru as Guru Maurice Pitka**
Worst Actor	Mike Myers	Larry the Cable Guy in Witless Protection as Larry Stalder
Worst Actor	Mike Myers	Eddie Murphy in Meet Dave as Dave Ming Cheng / The Captain
Worst Actor	Mike Myers	Al Pacino in 88 Minutes and Righteous Kill as Dr. Jack Gramm and Det. David "Rooster" Fisk (respectively)
Worst Actor	Mike Myers	Mark Wahlberg in The Happening and Max Payne as Elliot Moore and Max Payne (respectively)
Worst Actress	Paris Hilton	**Paris Hilton in The Hottie and the Nottie as Cristabel Abbott**
Worst Actress	Paris Hilton	Jessica Alba in The Eye and The Love Guru as Sydney Wells and Jane Bullard (respectively)
Worst Actress	Paris Hilton	Cameron Diaz in What Happens in Vegas as Joy McNally
Worst Actress	Paris Hilton	Kate Hudson in Fool's Gold and My Best Friend's Girl as Tess Finnegan and Alexis (respectively)
Worst Actress	Paris Hilton	Cast of The Women (Annette Bening, Eva Mendes, Debra Messing, Jada Pinkett Smith, and Meg Ryan) as Sylvie Fowler, Crystal Allen, Edie Cohen, Alex Fisher and Mary Haines (respectively)
Worst Supporting Actor	Pierce Brosnan	**Pierce Brosnan in Mamma Mia! as Sam Carmichael**
Worst Supporting Actor	Pierce Brosnan	Uwe Boll in Postal as Himself
Worst Supporting Actor	Pierce Brosnan	Ben Kingsley in The Love Guru, The Wackness, and War, Inc. as Guru Tugginmypudha, Dr. Jeffrey Squires, and Walken (respectively)
Worst Supporting Actor	Pierce Brosnan	Burt Reynolds in Deal and In the Name of the King as Tommy Vinson and King Konreid (respectively)
Worst Supporting Actor	Pierce Brosnan	Verne Troyer in The Love Guru and Postal as Coach Punch Cherkhov and Himself (respectively)
Worst Supporting Actress	Paris Hilton	**Paris Hilton in Repo! The Genetic Opera as Amber Sweet**
Worst Supporting Actress	Paris Hilton	Carmen Electra in Disaster Movie and Meet the Spartans as The Beautiful Assassin and Queen Margo (respectively)
Worst Supporting Actress	Paris Hilton	Kim Kardashian in Disaster Movie as Lisa Taylor
Worst Supporting Actress	Paris Hilton	Jenny McCarthy in Witless Protection as Connie
Worst Supporting Actress	Paris Hilton	Leelee Sobieski in 88 Minutes and In the Name of the King as Lauren Douglas/Lydia Doherty and Muriella (respectively)
Worst Screen Couple	Paris Hilton Christine Lakin Joel David Moore	**Paris Hilton and either Christine Lakin or Joel David Moore in The Hottie and the Nottie**
Worst Screen Couple	Paris Hilton Christine Lakin Joel David Moore	Uwe Boll and "any actor, camera, or screenplay"
Worst Screen Couple	Paris Hilton Christine Lakin Joel David Moore	Cameron Diaz and Ashton Kutcher in What Happens in Vegas
Worst Screen Couple	Paris Hilton Christine Lakin Joel David Moore	Larry the Cable Guy and Jenny McCarthy in Witless Protection
Worst Screen Couple	Paris Hilton Christine Lakin Joel David Moore	Eddie Murphy in Meet Dave (alongside himself)
Worst Prequel, Remake, Rip-off or Sequel		**Indiana Jones and the Kingdom of the Crystal Skull (Paramount)**
Worst Prequel, Remake, Rip-off or Sequel		The Day the Earth Stood Still (20th Century Fox) (remake of the 1951 film)
Worst Prequel, Remake, Rip-off or Sequel		Disaster Movie (Lionsgate) and Meet the Spartans (20th Century Fox) (jointly)
Worst Prequel, Remake, Rip-off or Sequel		Speed Racer (Warner Bros.)
Worst Prequel, Remake, Rip-off or Sequel		Star Wars: The Clone Wars (Warner Bros.)
Worst Director	Uwe Boll	**Uwe Boll for 1968 Tunnel Rats, In the Name of the King, and Postal**
Worst Director	Uwe Boll	Jason Friedberg and Aaron Seltzer for Disaster Movie and Meet the Spartans
Worst Director	Uwe Boll	Tom Putnam for The Hottie and the Nottie
Worst Director	Uwe Boll	Marco Schnabel for The Love Guru
Worst Director	Uwe Boll	M. Night Shyamalan for The Happening
Worst Screenplay	Mike Myers	**The Love Guru (written by Mike Myers and Graham Gordy)**
Worst Screenplay	Mike Myers	Disaster Movie and Meet the Spartans (jointly) (written by Jason Friedberg and Aaron Seltzer)
Worst Screenplay	Mike Myers	The Happening (written by M. Night Shyamalan)
Worst Screenplay	Mike Myers	The Hottie and the Nottie (written by Heidi Ferrer)
Worst Screenplay	Mike Myers	In the Name of the King (screenplay by Doug Taylor)
Worst Career Achievement	Uwe Boll	**Uwe Boll ("Germany's answer to Ed Wood")**

=== Films with multiple nominations ===
These films garnered multiple nominations:

Nominations	Films
7	The Love Guru
6	Disaster Movie
5	The Hottie and the Nottie
5	In the Name of the King
5	Meet the Spartans
4	The Happening
3	Postal
3	Witless Protection
2	88 Minutes
2	Meet Dave
2	What Happens in Vegas
2	Tunnel Rats

=== Films with multiple wins ===
Nominations	Films
3	The Love Guru
2	The Hottie and the Nottie

== See also ==
- 2008 in film
- 81st Academy Awards
- 62nd British Academy Film Awards
- 66th Golden Globe Awards
- 15th Screen Actors Guild Awards
