= In the Name of the King =

2007 film by Uwe Boll

- Theatrical release poster
- Directed by: Uwe Boll
- Screenplay by: Doug Taylor
- Story by: Jason Rappaport; Dan Stroncak; Doug Taylor
- Based on: Dungeon Siege by Gas Powered Games
- Produced by: Uwe Boll; Dan Clarke; Shawn Williamson
- Starring: Jason Statham; Leelee Sobieski; John Rhys-Davies; Ron Perlman; Claire Forlani; Kristanna Loken; Matthew Lillard; Brian J. White; Ray Liotta; Burt Reynolds
- Cinematography: Mathias Neumann
- Edited by: David Richardson
- Music by: Henning Lohner; Jessica de Rooij
- Production companies: Boll KG Productions; Herold Productions; Brightlight Pictures
- Distributed by: 20th Century Fox (Germany); Freestyle Releasing; Vivendi Entertainment (United States)
- Release dates: April 11, 2007 (Brussels International Festival of Fantasy Films); November 29, 2007 (Germany); January 11, 2008 (United States)
- Running time: 127 minutes
- Countries: Germany; Canada; United States
- Language: English
- Budget: $60 million
- Box office: $13.1 million

In the Name of the King (also known as Dungeon Siege: In the Name of the King or In the Name of the King: A Dungeon Siege Tale) is a 2007 fantasy action film directed by Uwe Boll and starring Jason Statham, Claire Forlani, Leelee Sobieski, John Rhys-Davies, Ron Perlman, Ray Liotta and Burt Reynolds with Kristanna Loken. It is inspired by the Dungeon Siege video game series, and was an international co-production between Germany, Canada, and the United States. It premiered at the Brussels Festival of Fantastic Films on April 11, 2007, and was released in theatres on November 29, 2007.

It is the first installment in the In the Name of the King film series. Upon its release, the film was a critical and commercial failure, grossing only $13.1 million against a budget of $60 million. Nevertheless, it spawned two sequels—In the Name of the King 2: Two Worlds and In the Name of the King 3: The Last Mission.

== Plot ==
In the kingdom of Ehb, a man known only as Farmer is living a happy life with his wife, Solana, and their young son, Zeph, in the town of Stonebridge. One day, the town gets attacked by the Krug, creatures known to be primitive and animal-like. They surprise the people by taking up arms, donning armour and are fighting with courage, intelligence and ferocity. It is all because they are magically controlled by Gallian, a powerful Magus who has become sadistic and megalomaniacal, and seeks to conquer and rule Ehb. During the attack, Farmer, along with his friend, Norick and his brother-in-law, Bastian, fights off the Krug. He fails to save Zeph; who is killed by Gallian via a Krug avatar. Through a Krug, Gallian claims to be unable to read Farmer. Solana and other Stonebridge inhabitants are taken prisoner.

King Konreid, Commander Tarish and Ehb's soldiers arrive at Stonebridge to survey the damage and recruit others to join their army. Merick, another Magus who serves Konreid, tries to learn of Farmer's identity when he notices Norick, who he believes he has seen before. Farmer, Norick and Bastian set off on their own to find Solana. Meanwhile, Merick's daughter, Muriella, who fell in love with Gallian, ends her romance with him after seeing his dark nature and realizing that he only trained her power so he can take it away. She confesses to her father, who believes that her love for Gallian has created an imbalance of their powers in Gallian's favour. Meanwhile, Konreid's selfish and immature nephew, Duke Fallow is in league with Gallian and he seeks to take his uncle's place. Gallian attempts to poison Konreid, while at the same time, unwittingly poisoning Fallow, who is then healed as Fallow takes a company of Ehb soldiers for his own. Soon after, Konreid heals and leads his army to go and fight Gallian's forces.

Going through Sedgwick Forest, Farmer and his companions encounter the reclusive nymphs led by Elora, who leads them out of the forest. When they attempt to rescue Solana from the Krug, Farmer gets knocked out, and Norick and Bastian get captured. While Farmer is being hanged by another one of Gallian's avatars, he kills the avatar, frees himself and is rescued by Merick. Farmer is taken to Konreid and his army's camp, where Merick reveals that Farmer is Konreid's long lost son and his real name is Camden Konreid. He explains that many years ago, a young Farmer was present during a battle at a place known as Oxley Pass, where he was found by Norick. Norick was considered to be the adoptive father, but Farmer was cared for by Stonebridge's inhabitants and was kept safe from all the chaos that ravaged Ehb. Konreid and Farmer both disapprove of Merick's claims.

Konreid catches Fallow, in his treachery, which leaves Fallow only his personal guard as the company turns from him and joins the rest of the army. Soon after, a battle erupts between Ehb's army and the Krug. Ehb's army, along with Farmer, eventually gain the upper hand and force the Krug to retreat, but Fallow succeeds in mortally wounding Konreid with an arrow. After the battle, Konreid and Farmer learn that they both share similar knowledge as Konreid declares Farmer his son, Camden, with his last breath and dies. Meanwhile, Tarish challenges Fallow to a duel. Tarish wins, yet Fallow still proclaims himself king until Camden, who arrives, is declared Konreid's son and now the new king. Fallow is arrested for treason and Camden readies everybody for the next battle.

Meanwhile, Norick, Bastian, and Solana are taken to Gallian's lair at Christwind Hold. Norick is killed while he and Bastian fight the Krug. Solana is taken to Gallian, who can sense Camden within her, who reveals that Solana is pregnant with Camden's second child. Going on a mission to infiltrate Gallian's lair, Camden is joined by Merick, Muriella and Elora, who has sided with Ehb against Gallian, while Tarish and the remaining army hold off against the advancing Krug. Merick magically enters the lair and fights Gallian, who manages to outsmart and kill Merick. Camden and Muriella manage to go into the lair as well, but Elora stays behind.

Camden finds Solana and fights Gallian in a sword battle. When Gallian resorts to using his magic to gain the upper hand, he prepares to kill him. Muriella arrives and tries to save Camden but Gallian defeats Muriella by weakening her magic. Suddenly, Solana stabs Gallian in the back. Wounded and enraged, Gallian tries to kill her, but Camden quickly saves her by slitting Gallian's throat and killing him. Gallian's magic influence goes away and the Krug go back to being primitive, saving Bastian and the prisoners, and Tarish and his battered forces. Having finally avenged his son, Camden and Solana are happily reunited as the kingdom is saved.

== Cast ==
- Jason Statham as Farmer / Camden Konreid
- Kristanna Loken as Elora
- Leelee Sobieski as Muriella
- Claire Forlani as Solana
- John Rhys-Davies as Merick
- Ron Perlman as Norick
- Matthew Lillard as Duke Fallow
- Ray Liotta as Gallian
- Burt Reynolds as King Konreid
- Brian White as Commander Tarish
- Mike Dopud as General Backler
- Will Sanderson as Bastian
- Tania Saulnier as Talwyn
- Gabrielle Rose as Delinda
- Terence Kelly as Trumaine
- Colin Ford as Zeph

== Production ==
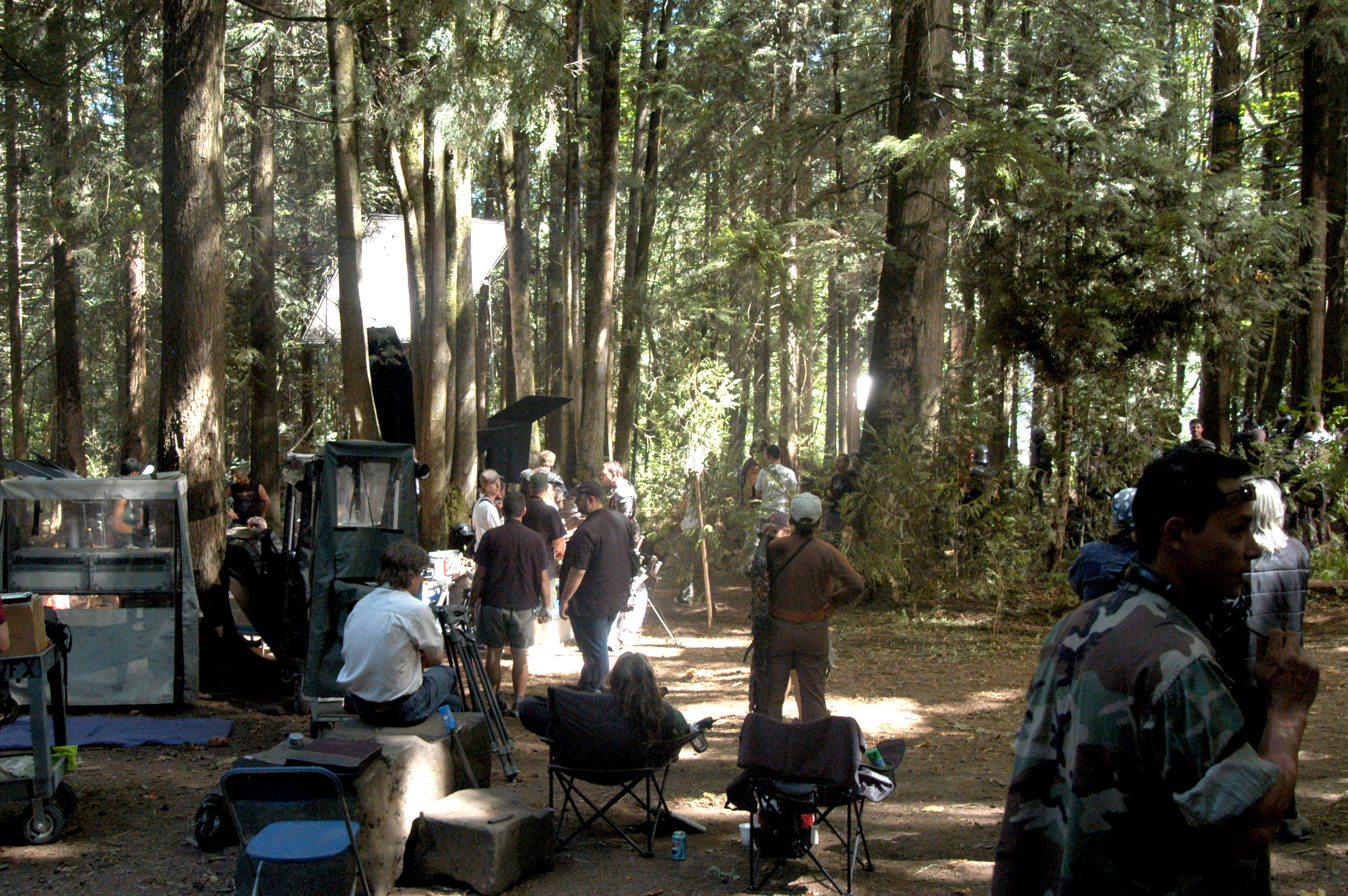
Parts of the film were shot in Robert Burnaby Park.

The production budget was $60 million, making it Uwe Boll's most expensive film production to date. Two versions of the film were produced: The 127-minute theatrical cut and a director's cut for a DVD release which runs 155 minutes.

The film was shot near the Municipality of Sooke, the westernmost area of the Greater Victoria, Capital Regional District (CRD), British Columbia. Locals and First Nations people were recruited as extras and for other duties.

Visual effects were added in post-production. Companies included Elektrofilm, Frantic Films, The Orphanage, PICTORION Das Werk, Rocket Science VFX, Technicolor Creative Services, TVT Postproduction, and Upstart! Animation.

== Music ==
German power metal band Blind Guardian recorded the movie's main theme, "Skalds and Shadows". British progressive metal band Threshold contributed the song "Pilot in the Sky of Dreams" from their album Dead Reckoning. Swedish power metal band HammerFall also contributed a track, "The Fire Burns Forever". Wolfgang Herold was the executive soundtrack producer.

== Reception ==
=== Box office ===
In the Name of the King was a box office bomb, grossing $2.98 million in its United States opening, not cracking that week's top ten. It grossed $10.3 million worldwide, including $2.47 million in Germany, $1.39 million in Russia and $1.22 million in Spain.

=== Critical response ===
The film received extremely negative reviews from critics. On the review aggregation website Rotten Tomatoes the film has an approval rating of 4% based on 52 reviews, with an average rating of 2.7/10. The website's critics consensus reads: "Featuring mostly wooden performances, laughable dialogue, and shoddy production values, In the Name of the King fulfills all expectations of an Uwe Boll film." The film is also ranked in that site's 100 worst reviewed films of the 2000s and in 2008, Time listed it on their list of top ten worst video game movies. Metacritic reported the film had an average score of 15 out of 100, based on 11 reviews — indicating "overwhelming dislike". Many critics attacked the film's close resemblances to other fantasy films, especially the popular Lord of the Rings films.

=== Accolades ===
The film received five nominations at the 29th Golden Raspberry Awards, including Worst Picture, Worst Screenplay, Worst Supporting Actor for Reynolds (also for Deal) and Worst Supporting Actress for Sobieski (also for 88 Minutes), with Boll winning Worst Director.

== Sequels ==
Despite being considered a bomb, Boll filmed a sequel titled In the Name of the King 2: Two Worlds. Filming began on December 1, 2010, and it was released in 2011. The film stars Dolph Lundgren and Natassia Malthe.

A third film, In the Name of the King 3: The Last Mission, was filmed in 2013 but not released until 2014. It starred Dominic Purcell, with Boll returning to direct.

== Home media ==
The DVD, released on April 15, 2008, does not include the 155-minute version. The Blu-ray release in December 2008 contains this edition. The German Blu-ray release also contains its 3D version. 813,147 units were sold, gathering a revenue of $14,865,984, more than its box office grossing.

== See also ==
- List of films based on video games
