= The Flintstones (1994 Ocean Software video game) =

1994 video game

- North American SNES box art
- Developers: Ocean of America (SNES); Twilight (Game Boy); Foley Hi-Tech (Genesis)
- Publisher: Ocean Software
- Platforms: Super NES; Game Boy; Sega Genesis
- Release: Game Boy: NA: December 1994; EU: 1994; SNES: NA: February 1995; EU: April 1995; Genesis: NA: January 1996 (Note: Only available via Sega Channel)
- Genre: Platform game
- Mode: Single-player

The Flintstones is a 1994 video game adaptation of the live-action 1994 film The Flintstones. It was released on Super NES and Game Boy, while a Sega Genesis version was distributed via Sega Channel.

== Gameplay ==
As Fred Flintstone, the player must save Fred's family from Cliff Vandercave.

The Flintstones is a 2D platforming game where the player controls Fred Flintstone who must rescue Pebbles, Bam-Bam, Barney, and Wilma from the evil Cliff Vandercave. All three versions feature different levels and enemies.

== Development and release ==
The Flintstones is based on the live-action 1994 film adaptation of The Flintstones animated sitcom from Hanna-Barbera. UK-based Ocean Software, which had a penchant for releasing licensed games based on intellectual properties, acquired the rights to the game tie-in. Versions were developed for the SNES (by Ocean themselves), Game Boy (by Twilight), and Sega Genesis (at least partially by Foley Hi-Tech). Mark Rogers was the development manager and chief programmer for the 16-bit ports. Throughout the game's production, the design team kept in close contact with the film's UK distributor United International Pictures, which provided them with the script, costume designs, and early showings. The developers were expected to match the character sprites with the movie's actors rather those of the original cartoon. Ocean sales manager Paul Patterson recalled The Flintstones was an example of why their products were sometimes delayed. He explained, "In the game we had Fred Flintstone walking away with his back to the screen. Unfortunately there was no artwork available from the studio because Fred Flintstones back was never seen on TV and this became a real problem getting it signed off."

Ocean published the Game Boy and SNES renditions in 1994 and 1995 respectively. Various magazines of the time projected the Genesis port for release between November 1994 and December 1995. It never received a physical release, but was instead briefly distributed digitally, exclusively via the Sega Channel in North America in 1996. While the full Genesis version of the game was considered lost for several years, a prototype allegedly taken from an EPROM surfaced online in 2019, containing no sound and only two levels. The full version of the game was later recovered by the Video Game History Foundation and released online in December 2025.

== Reception ==
Reception

Review scores
Publication	Score
Consoles +	77% (GB)
Electronic Gaming Monthly	5.8/10 (SNES)
GameFan	82% (SNES)
Mega Fun	47% (SNES)
Next Generation	3/5 (SNES)
Total!	50/100 (SNES)
Video Games (DE)	54% (SNES)
VideoGames & Computer Entertainment	8/10 (SNES)
GB Action	89% (GB)

Next Generation reviewed the SNES version, rating it three stars out of five, and stated that "the game (as the movie) could've used more innovation, but it looks good, and plays well". GamePro praised its graphics, multi-layered parallax scrolling, and "solid" controls, calling it overall a "fun" and "lightweight" game. Electronic Gaming Monthly's review crew gave it an average score of 5.8/10 from five reviewers, calling the game just a "routine sidescroller", and said that Taito's previous Flintstones games with graphics based on the cartoon were better, and that the graphics based on the movie "really [don't] work". VideoGames gave it an overall score of 8 out of 10, calling it a "solid" platformer with good replay value and particularly praising the "fluid" animations and "satisfying" sound effects. GameFan gave it an average score of 82% from three reviewers, who praised its difficulty and varied gameplay mechanics. All three reviewers heavily praised the graphics, with one comparing Fred's fluid animations to that of Prince of Persia (1989).

== See also ==
- List of The Flintstones video games
