= The Flintstones (film) =

1994 film by Brian Levant

- Theatrical release poster by Drew Struzan
- Directed by: Brian Levant
- Written by: Tom S. Parker; Jim Jennewein; Steven E. de Souza
- Based on: The Flintstones by: William Hanna; Joseph Barbera
- Produced by: Bruce Cohen
- Starring: John Goodman; Rick Moranis; Elizabeth Perkins; Rosie O'Donnell; Kyle MacLachlan; Halle Berry; Elizabeth Taylor
- Cinematography: Dean Cundey
- Edited by: Kent Beyda
- Music by: David Newman
- Production companies: Amblin Entertainment; Hanna-Barbera Productions
- Distributed by: Universal Pictures
- Release date: May 27, 1994
- Running time: 91 minutes
- Country: United States
- Language: English
- Budget: $46 million
- Box office: $341.6 million

The Flintstones is a 1994 American comedy film directed by Brian Levant and written by Tom S. Parker, Jim Jennewein, and Steven E. de Souza based on the 1960–1966 animated television series of the same name by Hanna-Barbera. The film stars John Goodman, Rick Moranis, Elizabeth Perkins, Rosie O'Donnell, Kyle MacLachlan, Halle Berry, and Elizabeth Taylor (in her final theatrical film appearance). The B-52's performed their version of the cartoon's theme song, playing cavemen versions of themselves as the BC-52's. In the film, after Fred Flintstone receives a promotion with the help of his friend Barney Rubble, he becomes entangled in the nefarious schemes of his boss Cliff Vandercave.

Development of a live-action film based on The Flintstones began in 1985. After several rejected drafts, the film rights were acquired by Amblin Entertainment and the script was finalized in 1993. Goodman was cast as Fred Flintstone at the insistence of executive producer Steven Spielberg. Filming took place in California and Utah, with physical effects provided by Jim Henson's Creature Shop and CGI created by Industrial Light & Magic.

The Flintstones was theatrically released by Universal Pictures on May 27, 1994. It received generally negative reviews from critics, but was a box office success, grossing almost $342 million worldwide against a $46 million budget. Its marketing campaign included a promotion with McDonald's and a video game based on the film. A prequel, The Flintstones in Viva Rock Vegas, was released in 2000.

== Plot ==
In Stone Age suburban Bedrock, Slate & Co.'s vice-president Cliff Vandercave and his secretary Sharon Stone plan to swindle the company of its vast fortune, pin the blame on a patsy, and flee. Fred Flintstone loans his best friend and neighbor Barney Rubble money so that he and his wife Betty can adopt a feral little boy named Bamm-Bamm, who can only pronounce his own name. Though initially hard to control because of his super strength, Bamm-Bamm eventually warms up to his new family and befriends Fred's daughter Pebbles. Cliff holds an aptitude test for a new executive; Barney notices Fred struggling with the test and, to return his kindness, switches his test with Fred's. Barney happened to have the highest score, so Fred is made an executive, but his first order from Cliff is to fire Barney, who received the lowest score from Fred's test. Fred refuses to fire his best friend because he just adopted Bamm-Bamm, but Cliff gives Fred a warning that if he doesn't fire Barney then Cliff would not only fire Barney but Fred would be fired as well.

Fred allows the Rubbles to move in with him and his wife Wilma while Barney attempts to find a new job, and Cliff lavishes Fred with material perks of his new position to distract him while using him to further his plans. Fred and Wilma become greedier and more self-centered while treating the Rubbles like servants, culminating with Barney revealing he switched their tests and he and Betty leaving. A remorseful Wilma, disgusted with Fred's actions, soon leaves afterward with Pebbles and moves in with her mother Pearl, and reconciles with Betty. Fred learns that Cliff's plan to build a "modernized" assembly line for Slate & Co. is a cover for his embezzlement, but Stone has tricked Fred into signing all the relevant forms, and also into firing most of the company's labor force. Fred is forced to go into hiding when Cliff reports his theft to the police. Wilma, disbelieving Fred's involvement, decides to break into his office and steal his "Dictabird", which remembers all conversations overheard in his office. Cliff observes her with the bird and realizes it overheard his admission of guilt to Fred.

Wilma and Betty find Fred and Barney about to be lynched by disgruntled ex-workers, and the Dictabird reveals to them Fred's innocence and that Cliff actually fired them. The two couples return home and find that Cliff has abducted Pebbles and Bamm-Bamm, and is holding them hostage in exchange for the Dictabird. The next day, Fred and Barney arrive at Cliff's assembly line and release the bird to him, and Cliff flees while Fred tries to stop the machinery and Barney goes to rescue their children. Stone arrives to stop Cliff from escaping, and Fred destroys the assembly line while Barney escapes with the kids. The machinery breaks down and a slurry of water and mineral waste cascades onto Cliff, encasing him entirely. Mr. Slate and the police arrive and the Dictabird clears Fred's name, and Mr. Slate is unexpectedly delighted by the material covering Cliff, naming it "concrete" in honor of his daughter Concretia. He orders the workers rehired and makes plans to begin mass-production of concrete, and offers Fred the position of president of their new concrete division, but Fred has realized that wealth changed him for the worst and declines. He instead asks for his old job back, with some additional benefits for the workers, and the two families return to their normal lives.

== Cast ==
- John Goodman as Fred Flintstone: A bronto-crane operator at Slate & Co.
- Rick Moranis as Barney Rubble: Fred's best friend and co-worker at Slate & Co.
- Elizabeth Perkins as Wilma Flintstone: Fred's wife.
- Rosie O'Donnell as Betty Rubble: Barney's wife.
- Kyle MacLachlan as Cliff Vandercave: An executive vice-president of Slate & Co.
- Halle Berry as Miss Sharon Stone: A Slate & Co. secretary in league with Cliff Vandercave.
- Elizabeth Taylor as Pearl Slaghoople: Wilma's mother.

In addition to the main cast, The Flintstones features Elaine and Melanie Silver as Fred's daughter Pebbles Flintstone, and Hlynur and Marinó Sigurðsson as Barney's adopted son Bamm-Bamm Rubble. (Note: E.G. Daily provided the voice for Bamm-Bamm Rubble.) The cast also includes Harvey Korman as the voice of the Dictabird, Dann Florek as Fred's supervisor Mr. Slate, Richard Moll and Irwin Keyes as Fred's respective co-workers Hoagie and Joe Rockhead, and Sheryl Lee Ralph as adoption agent Mrs. Pyrite.

News reporter Susan Rock is portrayed by Laraine Newman and Jay Leno plays the host of the television series Bedrock's Most Wanted. Fred Schneider, Kate Pierson and Keith Strickland of The B-52s appear as The BC-52s, with Parthenon Huxley on Gibstone Bass. Other cameos include Jonathan Winters as a co-worker of Fred and Barney's at Slate and Co., Jack O'Halloran as the Yeti, Jean Vander Pyl as Mrs. Feldspar (Vander Pyl was the voice of Wilma in the original animated series), and original series creators William Hanna and Joseph Barbera as a boardroom executive and a man driving a Mersandes, respectively.

== Production ==
=== Development and writing ===
In 1985, producers Keith Barish and Joel Silver bought the rights for a live-action feature film version of The Flintstones and commissioned Steven E. de Souza to write a script with Richard Donner hired to direct. De Souza's script submitted in September 1987 was eventually rejected and in October 1989 a new script by Daniel and Joshua Goldin was submitted. Peter Martin Wortmann and Robert Conte submitted another draft in March 1990 before Mitch Markowitz was hired to write a script. Said to be inspired by The Grapes of Wrath, Markowitz commented that "I don't even remember it that well, but Fred and Barney leave their town during a terrible depression and go across the country, or whatever that damn prehistoric thing is, looking for jobs. They wind up in trailer parks trying to keep their families together. They exhibit moments of heroism and poignancy." Markowitz's version was apparently too sentimental for director Donner, who disliked it. A further draft was then submitted and revised by Jeffrey Reno and Ron Osbourne in 1991 and 1992. Eventually, the rights were bought by Amblin Entertainment and Steven Spielberg who, after working with Goodman on Always, was determined to cast him in the lead as Fred. Brian Levant was hired as director because of his love for the original series.

When Levant was hired, all previous scripts were thrown out. In May 1992, Michael J. Wilson submitted a four-page story that became the basis for the film. This was turned into a script by Jim Jennewein and Tom S. Parker. A meeting of Levant, Bruce Cohen, Jason Hoffs and Kate Barker gave notes to Gary Ross, who produced another draft. Levant then recruited what he called an "all-star writing team" which consisted of his writer friends from television shows such as Family Ties, Night Court, and Happy Days. Levant described as "a sitcom on steroids, just trying to improve it." The writers, dubbed the Flintstone Eight, were Al Aidekman, Cindy Begel, Lloyd Garver, David Silverman, Stephen Sustarsic, Nancy Steen, Neil Thompson plus Levant. The group wrote a new draft but four more round table sessions ensued, each of which was attended by new talent, including Rob Dames, Lenny Ripps, Fred Fox Jr., Dava Savel, Lon Diamond, David Richardson, Roy Teicher, Richard Gurman, Michael J. Digaetano and Ruth Bennett. Lowell Ganz and Babaloo Mandel worked on it next with Levant, taking home a reported $100,000 for just two days' work. Rick Moranis was also present at Levant's roundtables, and later described the film as "one of those scripts that had about 18 writers." Levant made eight more revisions before finally registering a shooting script on August 7, 1993. Of the 35 writers, the Flintstone Eight were submitted for arbitration by the Writers Guild of America plus Wilson for story credit; however, credit was given to the first script by De Souza and to Jennewein and Parker for their drafts.

=== Casting ===
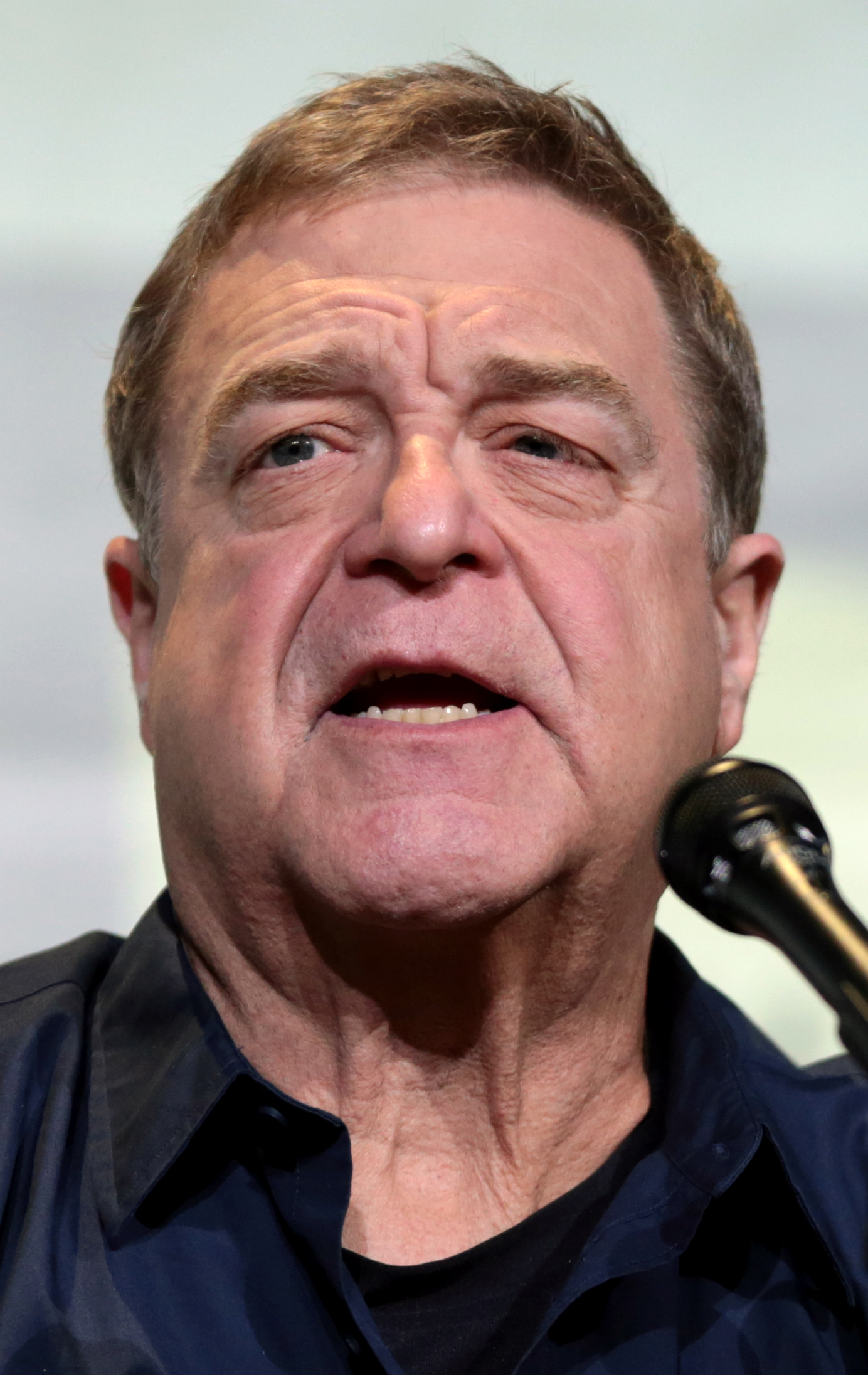
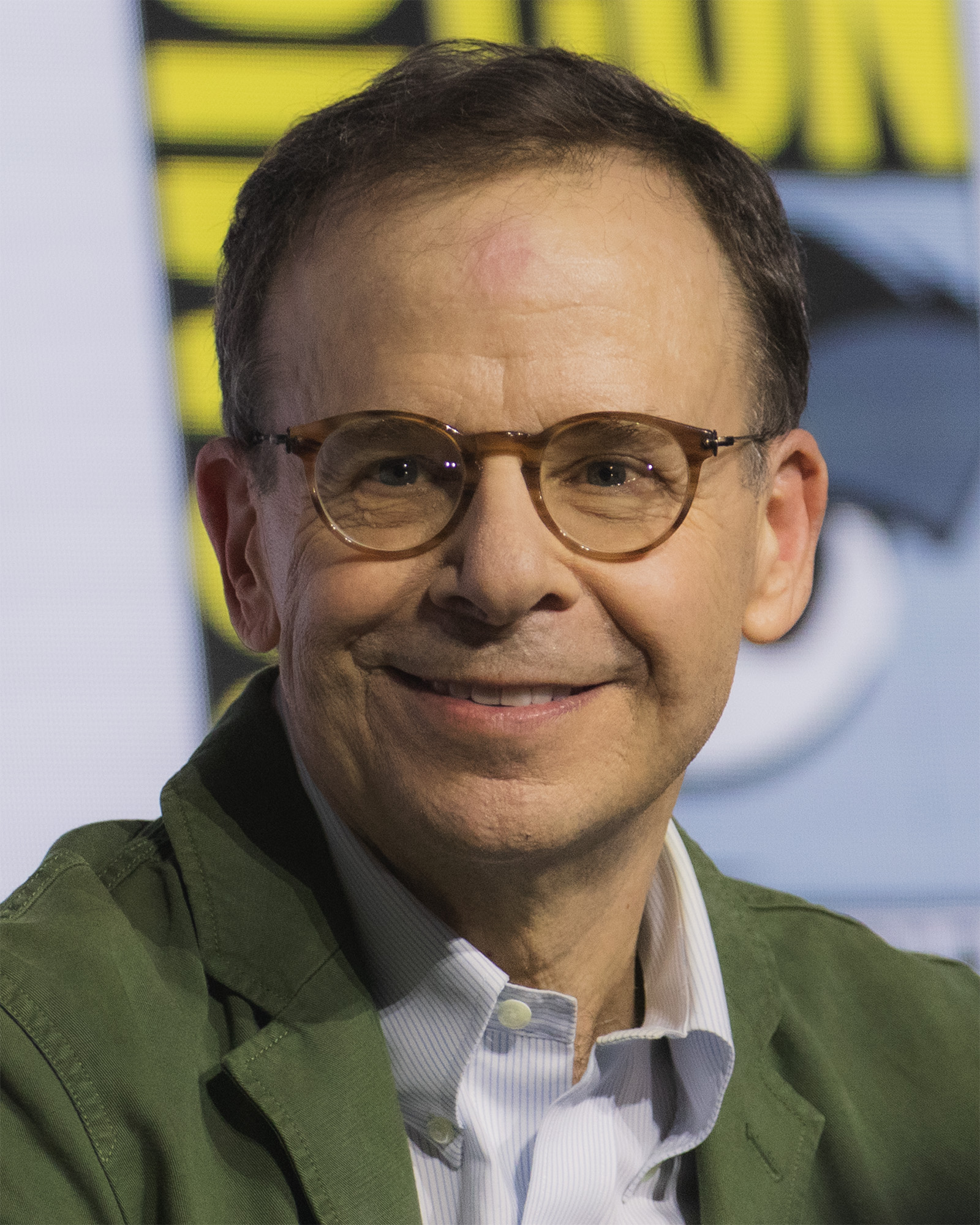
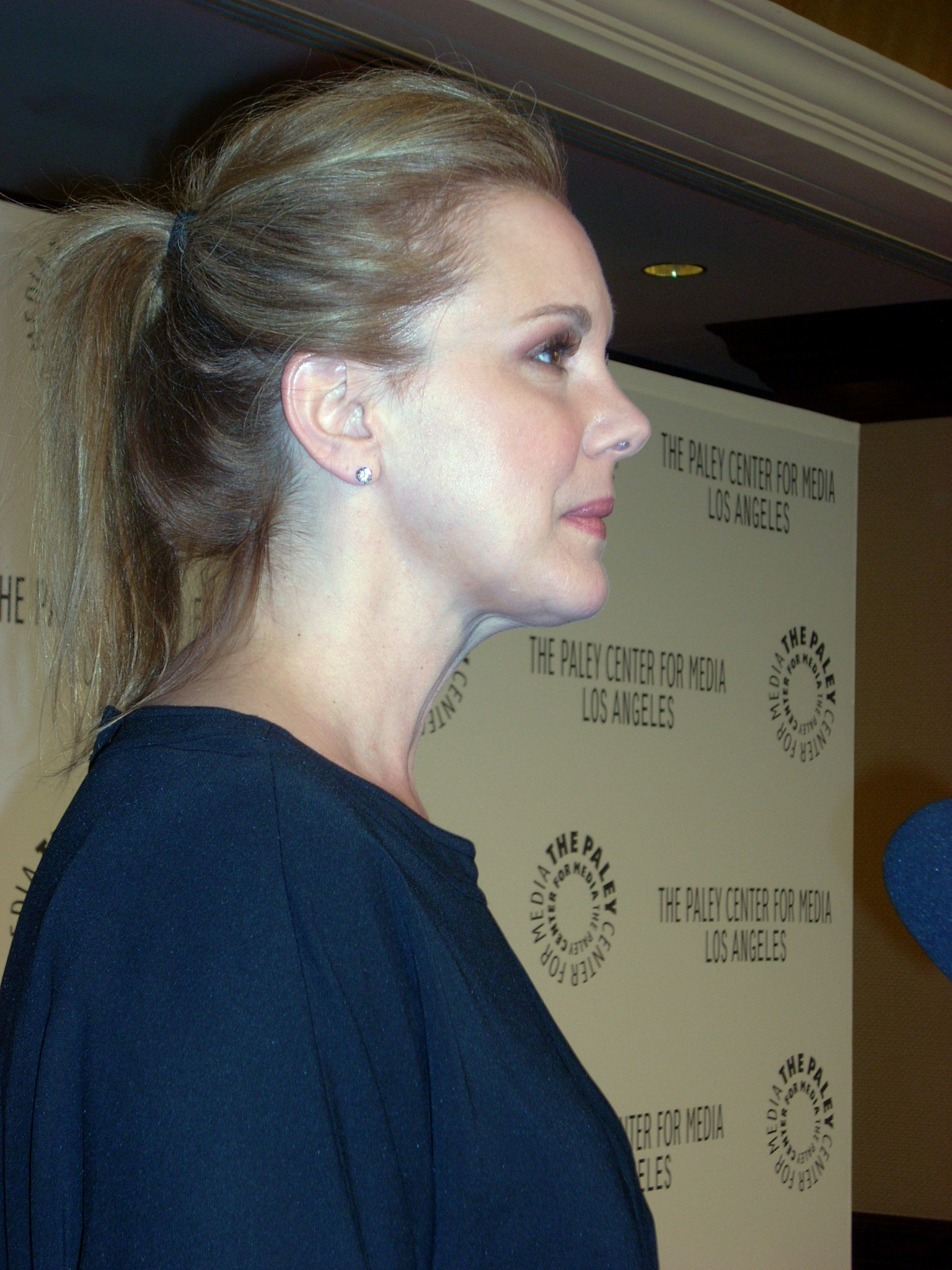
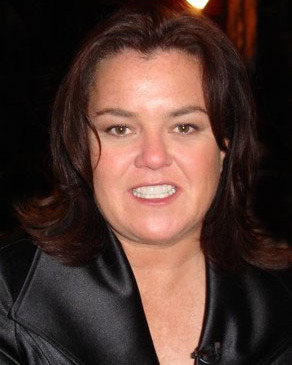
John Goodman (2016), Rick Moranis (2026), Elizabeth Perkins (2008) and Rosie O'Donnell (2006).

John Candy, Jim Belushi, Dan Aykroyd, Bill Murray, and Chevy Chase were all considered for the role of Fred Flintstone. The last four actors were all deemed too skinny and a fat suit was deemed too inappropriate to be used. John Goodman was Steven Spielberg's first and only choice for the role after he announced his casting years earlier at the table read for the film Always, when Spielberg said: "Ladies and gentlemen, I'd like to say something before we start: I've found my Fred Flintstone". Goodman stated during an episode of WTF with Marc Maron that he felt like he was "sandbagged" into the role when Spielberg announced his casting and stated "Oh God. Not this. I knew I was going to hear 'yabba dabba doo' for the rest of my life, and I…hadn’t liked 'The Flintstones' since I was in the fifth grade." He stated that "it just took the wind out of me. It was not something that I wanted to do," but said he felt like he didn't have a choice but to take on the role. Goodman later tried to back out about six months before filming started, stating, "I got drunk and called [Spielberg] and said, 'I don’t think I can do this'... I wound up doing it [anyway].’" Had Goodman turned the role down, the film would not have been made.

Geena Davis, Faith Ford, and Catherine O'Hara were all considered for the role of Wilma, but Elizabeth Perkins eventually won the role. Danny DeVito was the original first choice for Barney, but turned it down as he felt he was too gruff to do the character properly and reportedly suggested Rick Moranis for the role. DeVito was also considered for Fred. Although Janine Turner was considered, Rosie O'Donnell won the role of Betty Rubble with her impersonation of the cartoon character's signature giggle. Both Tracey Ullman and Daphne Zuniga were also considered for the role. Sharon Stone was to play Miss Stone, but she turned it down because of scheduling conflicts. The role was also offered to Nicole Kidman. Both Audrey Meadows and Elizabeth Montgomery were considered for the role of Pearl Slaghoople.

=== Filming ===
Principal photography began on May 17, 1993, and wrapped three months later, on August 20. Parts of the film were shot at Glen Canyon in Utah as well as Los Angeles County, California. Sets that resembled a complete street from Bedrock were constructed adjacent to Vasquez Rocks in California. Before they were totally demolished, visitors could tour the location. The effects for Dino, the Dictabird and other prehistoric creatures were provided by Jim Henson's Creature Shop while most of the film's CGI effects were provided by Industrial Light & Magic after Levant was impressed by their work on the dinosaurs in Jurassic Park (another Universal/Amblin production released the previous year).

== Marketing ==
McDonald's marketed a number of Flintstones promotions for the film, including the return of the McRib sandwich and the "Grand Poobah Meal" combo with it, a line of premium glass mugs, and toys based on characters and locations from the film. In the commercials and released items for the Flintstones promotion, McDonald's was renamed "RocDonald's" with Stone Age imagery, similarly to other businesses and proper names in the Flintstones franchise. The week the film was released, MTV aired a block of The Grind with Eric Nies at the film's Bedrock set with dancers in cave outfits performing to hit music at the time from Ace of Base, Was (Not Was), Warren G and Nate Dogg while Eric asked the dancers themed trivia questions from the show and encouraged the viewers to purchase the film's soundtrack. In the United Kingdom, Tetley promoted TV commercials with audio from the film, including mugs starring characters from the film. Jurassic Park, the name of another movie, was also seen briefly as a park in the film.

== Video game ==
The Flintstones, a video game based on the film, was developed by Ocean Software and released for the Game Boy in 1994 and the Super Nintendo Entertainment System in 1995. A version for the Sega Genesis developed by Foley Hi-Tech was also briefly distributed via the Sega Channel in 1995. In the game, the player takes control of Fred Flintstone and has to rescue Wilma, Barney, Pebbles and Bam-Bam from Cliff Vandercave.

== Reception ==
=== Box office ===
The Flintstones was a box office success, grossing $130.5 million in the U.S. and Canada, including the $37.2 million it made during its 4-day Memorial Day opening weekend in 1994 (a then-record gross for the Memorial Day weekend, surpassing Indiana Jones and the Last Crusade). It performed well internationally, making another $211.1 million, for a total of $341.6 million worldwide, more than seven times its $46 million budget. In 1996, Mission: Impossible surpassed The Flintstones to have the highest Memorial Day opening weekend gross. The film topped the box office for two weeks until it was dethroned by Speed. In the United Kingdom, it had the second highest opening week at the time behind Jurassic Park, with a gross of $8.7 million. In Mexico, it had a record opening with $4.9 million in four days. In Australia, it grossed $2 million in its opening weekend, also the second highest at the time behind Jurassic Park. In Italy, it grossed $4.8 million in its first six days, again the second biggest opener in Italy at the time behind Jurassic Park. It set opening records in Hungary and Poland. It went on to gross over $15 million in Italy, $35 million in Germany, $31 million in the United Kingdom, $20 million in Japan and $11 million in Australia. It did not perform well in France ($4 million) or South Korea.

=== Critical response ===
The Flintstones received negative reviews upon release, with many critics panning its script. On the review aggregator website Rotten Tomatoes, 23% of 48 critics' reviews are positive, with an average rating of 4/10. The website's consensus reads: "The Flintstones wastes beloved source material and imaginative production design on a tepid script that plunks Bedrock's favorite family into a cynical story awash with lame puns." Metacritic, which uses a weighted average, assigned the film a score of 38 out of 100, based on 15 critics, indicating "generally unfavorable" reviews. Audiences surveyed by CinemaScore gave the film a grade "B+" on scale of A+ to F.

On Siskel & Ebert & the Movies, Roger Ebert of the Chicago Sun-Times and his colleague Gene Siskel of the Chicago Tribune gave the film two thumbs down. Ebert gave it 2.5 stars out of 4 in his newspaper review. He said the production design was "delightful and inventive" and the highlight of the film, while lamenting how "the story is confusing, not very funny, and kind of odd, given the target audience of younger children and their families" who would likely be uninterested in embezzling and mother-in-law problems. Siskel gave the film 1.5 stars out of 4 in his newspaper review.

Kenneth Turan of the Los Angeles Times wrote that the film never had much potential and "has been carefully designed to be as bright and insubstantial as a child's toy balloon." Comparing the film to The Addams Family, he called both films "clever, lively and ultimately wearying pieces of showy Hollywood machinery" that favor visuals over writing.

Caryn James of The New York Times wrote that Goodman "goes a long way toward carrying The Flintstones over a script that is essentially a bunch of rock jokes and puns stretched to feature-film length," but James also said the film is too faithful to its 1960s source material and lacks modern pop culture references.

Todd McCarthy of Variety said that "with all manner of friendly beasts, a superenergetic John Goodman and a colorful supporting cast inhabiting a Bedrock that resembles a Stone Age version of Steven Spielberg suburbia, this live-action translation of the perennial cartoon favorite is a fine popcorn picture for small fry, and perfectly inoffensive for adults."

Michael Wilmington of the Chicago Tribune wrote that the film resembled "a mountain of production, a rock of a cast, [and] a pebble of thought."

A few reviews were positive, including one from Richard Schickel of Time, who said that "nothing has been lost—or worse, inflated out of proportion" in the adaptation. He said it "doesn't feel overcalculated, over-produced or overthought."

In a 1997 interview, Joseph Barbera, co-founder of Hanna-Barbera Productions and co-creator of The Flintstones, stated that, although he was impressed by the film's visuals, he felt the story "wasn't as good as I could have made it."

=== Year-end lists ===
- 1st worst – Desson Howe, The Washington Post
- 1st worst – Todd Anthony, Miami New Times
- 3rd worst – Janet Maslin, The New York Times
- 5th worst – Dan Craft, The Pantagraph
- 10th worst – Peter Travers, Rolling Stone
- Worst films (not ranked) – Jeff Simon, The Buffalo News

=== Accolades ===
O'Donnell won the Golden Raspberry Award for Worst Supporting Actress for her performance in this film. The film also won Worst Screenplay and was nominated for two others: Taylor as Golden Raspberry Award for Worst Supporting Actress (the second performance in the film nominated for this award) and for the film as Worst Remake or Sequel. At the 1994 Stinkers Bad Movie Awards, the film was nominated for Worst Resurrection of a TV Show and Worst Actress for O'Donnell. The film also received four Saturn Award nominations, including Best Fantasy Film, Best Costume Design and Best Supporting Actress for O'Donnell's and Berry's performances.

== Home media ==
The film was released on VHS and LaserDisc on November 8, 1994, by MCA/Universal Home Video. It was successful in the home video market, and became the 13th best-selling video of 1995 in the United States. It was released on DVD on March 16, 1999, and on Blu-ray on August 19, 2014. A limited edition 4K UHD steelbook, including a Blu-ray disc, was released by Shout! Factory on June 2, 2026.

== Prequel ==
A prequel, The Flintstones in Viva Rock Vegas, was released in 2000. The original main cast did not reprise their roles of the characters, though O'Donnell provided the voice of an octopus who gave massages to younger versions of Wilma and Betty. Irwin Keyes returned as Joe Rockhead, the only cast member to reprise his role from the first film. It received negative reviews and was a box office failure.

== See also ==
- List of American films of 1994
- List of live-action films based on cartoons and comics
- Theatrically released films based on Hanna-Barbera cartoons
