= Princess (2008 film) =

2008 American TV film

- Film poster
- Written by: Heidi Ferrer
- Directed by: Mark Rosman
- Starring: Nora Zehetner; Kip Pardue; Nicole Gale Anderson
- Composer: Richard Marvin
- Country of origin: United States
- Original language: English

Production
- Producer: John Calvert
- Cinematography: David A. Makin
- Editor: Bonnie Koehler
- Running time: 89 minutes

Original release
- Network: ABC Family
- Release: April 20, 2008

Princess is a 2008 American television film starring Kip Pardue and Nora Zehetner. The film premiered on ABC Family on April 20, 2008.

== Plot ==
William, who is surviving off of the last of his trust fund, falls in love with Princess Ithaca who heals mythical creatures.

== Cast ==
- Nora Zehetner as Princess Ithaca
- Kip Pardue as William Humphries
- Deborah Grover as Nana
- Matthew Edison as Louis Baxter
- Mayko Nguyen as Sophie Baxter
- Nicole Gale Anderson as Jitterbug/Princess Calliope
- Dominic Cuzzocrea as Manticore
- Brian Paul as Mr. Danforth
- Deborah Tennant as Mrs. Danforth
- Shileen Paton as Mermaid - Cala
- Rebecca Northan as Angular Woman
- Ashley Wright as Stout Husband
- Craig Burnatowski as Tattoo Guy
- Kerry Griffin as Man in Front
- Norma Clarke as Well Dressed Woman
- Libby Adams as Little Girl #1
- Azuriah Glaze-Dominique as Little Girl #2
- Aurora Kruk as Female Street Kid
- Jasmine Richards as Skater Girl
- Mallory Margel as 18-year-old Girl
- Devon Bostick as Older Boy
- Kasia Vassos as Fairy Mother
- Andrew Craig as Male Street Kid
- Ryan Gifford as Yeti
- Tanya Manjura as Pixie #1
- Siarhei Bushchyk as Pixie #2
- Mya Rylyn Banks as Fairy Baby
