= The Hottie and the Nottie =

- Theatrical release poster
- Directed by: Tom Putnam
- Written by: Heidi Ferrer
- Produced by: Myles Nestel; Victoria Nevinny; Neal Ramer; Hadeel Reda
- Starring: Paris Hilton; Joel David Moore; Christine Lakin
- Cinematography: Alex Vendler
- Edited by: Jeff Malmberg
- Music by: David E. Russo
- Production companies: Paris Hilton Entertainment; Purple Pictures; Summit Entertainment
- Distributed by: Regent Releasing (United States); Summit Entertainment (International)
- Release date: February 8, 2008
- Running time: 91 minutes
- Country: United States
- Language: English
- Budget: $9 million
- Box office: $1.6 million

The Hottie and the Nottie (stylized as The Hottie & The Nottie) is a 2008 American romantic comedy film starring Paris Hilton, Joel David Moore, and Christine Lakin. Written by Heidi Ferrer and directed by Tom Putnam, the film began shooting in January 2007 and was released theatrically on February 8, 2008.

The film was a critical and commercial failure, and has been called one of the worst films of all time. Paris Hilton won the Golden Raspberry Award for Worst Actress, which was one of three "Razzies" she received at the 29th Golden Raspberry Awards.

== Plot ==
Nate Cooper is unable to get it together with women. But he also cannot forget his first love: the beautiful Cristabel Abbott, from their time in elementary school. Nate sets out for the beaches of California and meets up with his geeky best friend Arno, whose mother has an unnatural amount of information about Cristabel, and perhaps an unusual relationship with her son.

Cristabel jogs on the beach every day with many suitors trying to catch her eye, including an albino stalker. But she's still single, and there is a reason: Cristabel is still best friends with the same short, unattractive brunette girl whom Nate also knew in elementary school, June Phigg.

Nate reintroduces himself to Cristabel and they hit it off. However, she refuses to go on a date with him unless June has a date as well. Nate sets out to find a boyfriend for June, but men recoil at the sight of her. He tricks someone, under the pretense that he's offering $500 for participating in medical testing, then explains it's to date June. At first, he's repulsed by her, but Nate hypnotizes him, so temporarily fools his brain, but in the middle of a date he snaps out of it and runs.

One day at the Santa Monica Pier, Johann Wulrich, an attractive dentist and a part-time model, appears in their lives. He seems to want to do a makeover on June when he apparently sees her inner beauty. However, Nate believes that Johann is a threat to his shot for Cristabel, since Johann is almost perfect. Eventually, with June dating Johann, Cristabel finally begins dating Nate, per his original plan.

Over the next few weeks, as Nate and June become friends, she emerges from her cocoon, with her face and appearance transforming. She becomes a more and more attractive woman whose beauty begins to be comparable to Cristabel's. Nate slowly realizes that June may be the girl of his dreams. When he realizes this, Nate tells Cristabel, who is happy for June.

Nate then hurries to find June, discovering that she had rejected Johann, who'd thought he would get 'grateful sex' from her. When Nate finds her, he tells her he loves her, and they kiss.

== Cast ==
- Paris Hilton as Cristabel Abbott
  - Karley Scott Collins as young Cristabel Abbott
- Joel David Moore as Nate Cooper
  - Caleb Guss as young Nate Cooper
- Christine Lakin as June Phigg
  - Alessandra Daniele as young June Phigg
- The Greg Wilson as Arno Blount
  - Kurt Doss as young Arno Blount
- Marianne Muellerleile as Mrs. Blount
- Johann Urb as Johann Wulrich
- Scott Prendergast as Randy ("Creepy Albino Stalker")
- Morgan Rusler as Stan ("Marry Me" Guy)
- Adam Kulbersh as Cole Slawsen
- Kathryn Fiore as Jane
- Gino Anthony Pesi as Cheesy Guy

== Reception ==
=== Box office ===
Opening on February 8, 2008, The Hottie and the Nottie grossed $9,000 on opening day, and it went on to earn $27,696 on its opening weekend, each theater averaging $249. The Houston Chronicle determined that, based on average ticket prices, this represented an average of 35 people per theatre on its opening weekend, or an average of five per showing. In the end, the film grossed $1,596,232 worldwide, making the film a gigantic financial disaster.

For its release in the United Kingdom, the film was advertised as "The Number One Film", with small print revealing its being number 1 on the Internet Movie Database's Bottom 100. The film opened at number 32 and grossed $34,231 in 28 theaters in the UK.

=== Critical response ===
The film was universally panned by critics, with most of the criticism aimed towards the film's premise and Hilton's acting performance. On Rotten Tomatoes, the film has an approval rating of 6% based on reviews from 67 critics. The site's consensus states: "The Hottie and the Nottie is a crass, predictable, and ineptly staged gross-out comedy that serves little purpose beyond existing as another monument to Paris Hilton's vanity." On Metacritic, it has a weighted average score of 7 out of 100, based on 18 reviews—indicating "overwhelming dislike".

IGN gave it a zero-star review, noting that the film "presents a problem because there are just no words to adequately express how clumsy, trite and deeply offensive it is from start to finish." Rolling Stone film critic Peter Travers gave the film a half-star rating, saying that the half-star was because "it takes guts (or gross dim-wittedness) [for Hilton] to appear on screen again after House of Wax." Nathan Lee of The Village Voice called it "crass, shrill, disingenuous, tawdry, mean-spirited, vulgar, idiotic, boring, slapdash, half-assed, and very, very unfunny." Online film critic James Berardinelli described the film's comedy as "about as funny as the anal rape scene in The War Zone". Richard Roeper called the film "excruciatingly, painfully, horribly, terribly awful," and argued that "nobody in this movie really should have a career in movies". BBC reviewer Mark Kermode called it "a fascist eugenic tract...it's disgusting". Connie Ogle in the Miami Herald described The Hottie and the Nottie thus: "Imagine the worst movie you've ever seen. Got it? Now try to think of something worse. That something is this movie – wretched, embarrassing and a waste of the time and energy of everyone involved." The British newspaper The People, reviewing The Hottie and the Nottie, called the film "the worst movie ever made".

John Anderson of Newsday, while panning the film, was one of a handful of critics to see merit in it. He gave the film two out of four stars and concluded that "The Hottie and the Nottie is no worse in many ways than a lot of teen-centric comedies, which generally appeal to their audience through cruelty and vulgarity."

The film featured on several worst of 2008 lists, including that of The Times, New York Post, The Star-Ledger, The Tart, and Metromix. In 2018 British critic Mark Kermode included the film on his list of the ten worst films of the past ten years.

=== Accolades ===
| Award | Category | Nominee | Result | Ref. |
|---|---|---|---|---|
| Razzie Award | Worst Actress | Paris Hilton | Won | |
| Razzie Award | Worst Screen Couple | Paris Hilton | Won | |
| Razzie Award | Worst Screen Couple | Joel David Moore | Won | |
| Razzie Award | Worst Screen Couple | Christine Lakin | Won | |
| Razzie Award | Worst Screenplay | Heidi Ferrer | Nominated | |
| Razzie Award | Worst Picture | Hadeel Reda | Nominated | |
| Razzie Award | Worst Picture | Neal Ramer | Nominated | |
| Razzie Award | Worst Picture | Myles Nestel | Nominated | |
| Razzie Award | Worst Picture | Victoria Nevinny | Nominated | |
| Razzie Award | Worst Director | Tom Putnam | Nominated | |

== Home media ==
The Hottie and the Nottie was released on DVD on May 6, 2008.

== See also ==
- List of 21st century films considered the worst
