= Jim Jennewein =

American novelist

James 'Jim' Jennewein
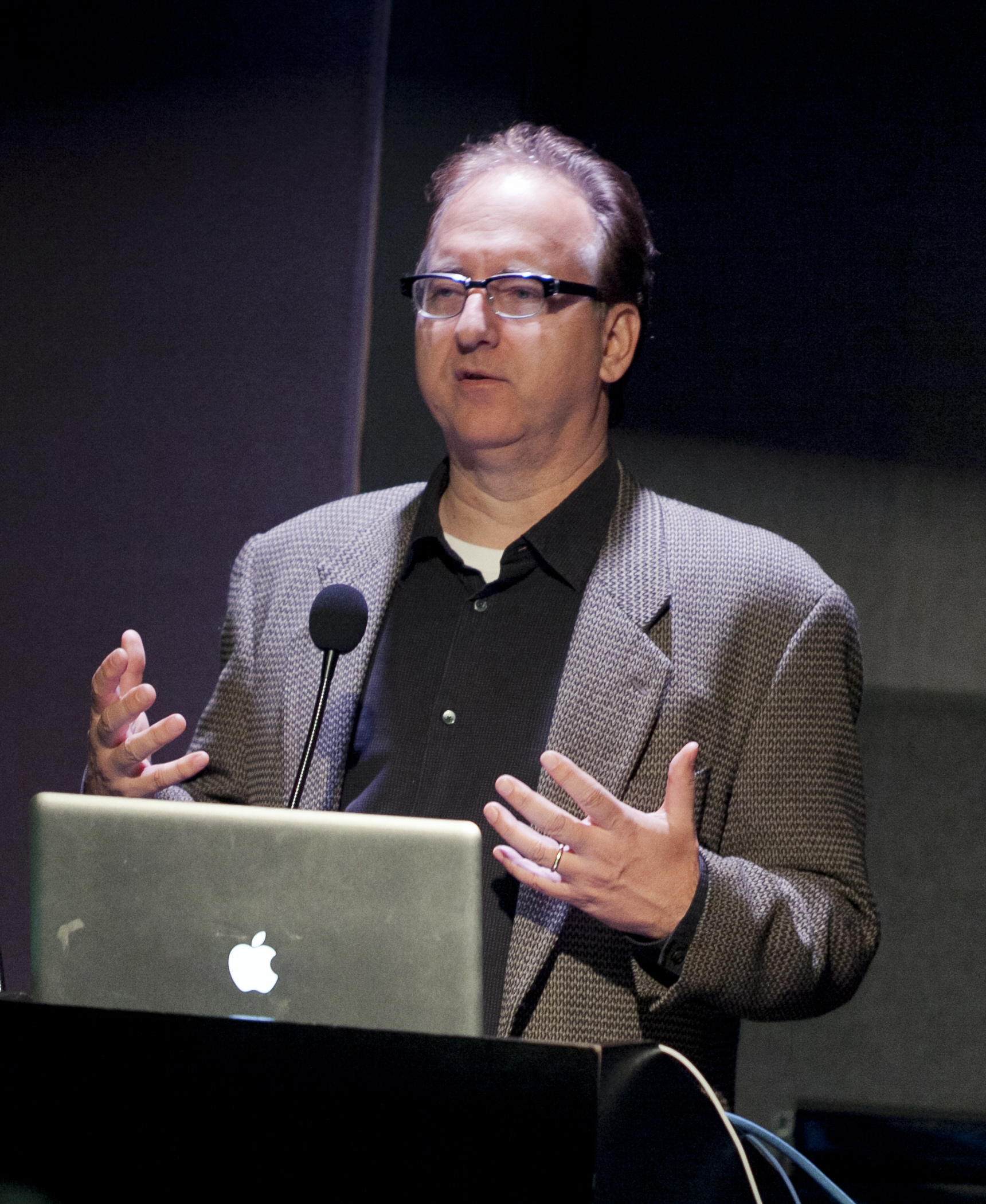
- Jim Jennewein at Vancouver Film School in October 2011
- Education: University of Notre Dame
- Occupations: Screenwriter, educator
- Known for: The Flintstones; Getting Even with Dad

James 'Jim' Jennewein is an American screenwriter, author, teacher and writer, best known for writing several major Hollywood comedies of the 1990s, including the feature film adaptation of The Flintstones. He collaborates with Tom S. Parker.

== Career ==
Jennewein graduated from the University of Notre Dame, and worked as a copywriter in advertising before becoming a screenwriter. With fellow copywriter Parker, the duo wrote Stay Tuned on spec. Within two days, the pair had signed with the Bauer Benedek agency and sold it for $750,000.

With Parker, Jennewein wrote the first draft of the film version of Super Mario Bros., which was a comedic fairy tale, focusing on Mario and Luigi attempting to rescue a princess named Hildy from Koopa. That draft would be rejected and scrapped after former director Greg Beeman was replaced due to the failure of Mom and Dad Save the World. On The Flintstones, their most commercially successful project, they were part of a record 35 writers attached to the project before it was shot. Conversely, Ri¢hie Ri¢h underperformed at the North America box office, making back less than its $40 million budget, but made $125 million in VHS rentals.

In 2008, he partnered with Parker and together they wrote their first novel, Runewarriors: Shield of Odin, which is based on Norse mythology. The Runewarriors series was continued with 2010's Sword of Doom and 2011's Ship of the Dead. He taught screenwriting at CSU Northridge, and is currently a professor at Fordham University, teaching screenwriting and TV Drama.

== Film credits ==
- Stay Tuned (1992) - screenplay, story
- Ri¢hie Ri¢h (1994)
- Getting Even with Dad (1994) - associate producer, writer
- The Flintstones (1994)
- Major League II (1994) - story
- A Mighty Wind (2003) actor (as James Jennewein)— Witch #3
