= Heidi Ferrer =

American screenwriter (1970–2021)

- Born: May 28, 1970; Kansas, US
- Died: May 26, 2021 (aged 50); Los Angeles, California, US
- Occupation: Writer

Heidi Ferrer (May 28, 1970 – May 26, 2021) was an American screenwriter who worked on Dawson's Creek, The Hottie and the Nottie, and Princess. She died by suicide after a 13-month battle with Long Covid which she developed after an asymptomatic infection with Sars-CoV-2. Following her death her organs were determined to be suitable for organ donation, despite her family's concern about the use of her organs. She was married to director/writer Nick Güthe.

== Selected publications ==
- Ferrer, Heidi (December 3, 2012). Crooked Love. Girl to Mom. ISBN 978-0-615-73212-1.
