= The Love Guru =

2008 film by Marco Schnabel

- American theatrical release poster
- Directed by: Marco Schnabel
- Written by: Mike Myers; Graham Gordy
- Produced by: Michael De Luca; Mike Myers
- Starring: Mike Myers; Jessica Alba; Justin Timberlake; Romany Malco; Meagan Good; Omid Djalili; Ben Kingsley; John Oliver
- Cinematography: Peter Deming
- Edited by: Lee Haxall; Gregory Perler; Billy Weber
- Music by: George S. Clinton
- Production companies: Spyglass Entertainment; Michael De Luca Productions; NoMoneyFun Films
- Distributed by: Paramount Pictures (United States and United Kingdom); Kinowelt Filmverleih (Germany)
- Release dates: June 20, 2008 (United States); August 1, 2008 (United Kingdom); October 2, 2008 (Germany)
- Running time: 87 minutes
- Countries: United States; United Kingdom; Germany
- Language: English
- Budget: $62 million
- Box office: $40.9 million

The Love Guru is a 2008 romantic comedy film directed by Marco Schnabel in his directorial debut. It was written and produced by Mike Myers, who was the leading cast-member along with Jessica Alba, Justin Timberlake, Romany Malco, Meagan Good, Verne Troyer, John Oliver, Omid Djalili, and Ben Kingsley. The film follows Pitka (Myers), a guru who is tasked with revitalizing the Toronto Maple Leafs hockey team.

Myers came up with the concept of a Guru character in the late 1990s. The aforementioned character was initially planned to appear in the Austin Powers franchise, but was left unimplemented. The film came from Myers' desire to make a hockey movie, expressing wish fulfillment in the film's plot. Filming commenced in Toronto, Canada in August 2007. Before release, the film's portrayal of Hinduism received divided responses from Hindu audiences, who remained cautious at the film's handling of cultural themes. Paramount Pictures, the film's main distributor, eventually enabled pre-screenings for select representatives of the Hindu American Foundation (HAF), who concluded that the film was not problematic.

The Love Guru was released in the United States on June 20, 2008, by Paramount, with the United Kingdom and Germany getting releases later that year in August and October, respectively, albeit with a different distribution partner for the latter. It was panned by critics and audiences who criticized its humor, screenplay, and Schnabel's direction, often being considered a low point in Myers' career and one of the worst films ever made. It was a box-office failure, grossing $40.9 million on a budget of $62 million. At the 29th Golden Raspberry Awards, the film won three of its seven nominations, including Worst Picture.

== Plot ==
Guru Pitka is the self-proclaimed "number-two guru in the world", after Deepak Chopra. A flashback shows Pitka was an orphan, taught by Guru Tugginmypudha. When the twelve-year-old Pitka announces he wants to become a guru so that girls will love him, Tugginmypudha puts a chastity belt on him until he can learn that loving himself is more important than being loved by others.

Pitka's dream is to become the number-one guru and appear on The Oprah Winfrey Show. He lives a privileged life with thousands of followers, including celebrities Jessica Simpson, Val Kilmer, and Mariska Hargitay (whose name is used as a faux-Hindi greeting). Pitka's teachings, which involve simplistic acronyms and plays on words, are displayed in PowerPoint slide shows.

In Canada, Jane Bullard inherits the Toronto Maple Leafs hockey team, who are on a losing streak. Their star player, Darren Roanoke, has been playing badly ever since his wife Prudence left him for Los Angeles Kings goaltender Jacques "Lè Coq" Grandé. Jane is a big fan of Pitka's and offers him $2 million to fix Darren's marriage so the team can win the Stanley Cup. Pitka's agent tells him if he succeeds, Oprah will have him on her show. Pitka also meets team coach Cherkov, and mocks his dwarfism.

Pitka and Jane bond on the plane ride. Jane became a fan of Pitka's work due to the death of her father and admits she has a crush on Pitka. When Jane says she had a gay experience in college, Pitka gets an erection, causing his chastity belt to clank.

During a game, Pitka encourages the rival team to beat up Darren to distract him. Darren begins to play well, but then gets suspended for the next two games after beating up Lè Coq and hitting Coach Cherkov with a hockey puck.

Pitka has dinner with Jane and almost kisses her, but his chastity belt clanks again. She leaves feeling rejected. In revenge for Pitka's antics, Coach Cherkov punches Pitka in the testicles. Pitka throws a tantrum over the pain in his testicles as they are overly sensitive due to 33 years of blue balls.

Dick Pants warns Pitka to hurry up the process, or he will lose his spot on Oprah to Deepak Chopra again. Pitka is adamant that Darren is not ready, but puts Darren and his wife together regardless. This reconciliation fails. Pitka then drives himself and Darren to Niagara Falls and helps Darren realize that since his mother only showed him love when he succeeded, he had grown to believe Prudence would only love him if he won.

With time running out, Pitka distracts Lè Coq with his idol, Celine Dion, and lies to Prudence that Darren stood up to his mom, encouraging her to return to her husband. With his newfound confidence due to Prudence taking him back, Darren plays like his old self, leading the Maple Leafs to three straight wins, taking the series to Game 7. During the final game, Lè Coq, having heard that Darren cannot play with his mother watching, gets her to sing the national anthem, causing Darren to flee. At the airport on his way to be a guest on Oprah, Pitka sees the news on television and goes back to help Darren. Pitka reveals his chastity belt to Jane, explaining why he pulled away from her. Jane says she understands.

After standing up to his mother, Darren recovers until Lè Coq brags that Prudence prefers him in bed. Darren freezes, and Pitka realizes he needs another distraction, which he provides by getting two elephants to have sex in the middle of the rink. Darren wakes from his stupor and scores the winning goal. After the game, Coach Cherkov apologizes for the groin attack, Pitka offers a hug, but as Cherkov obliges, he punches him in the face and threatens to beat him up if he ever attacks him again. They then make up and become friends. He then meets Deepak Chopra and decides that he is fine with being the first Guru Pitka instead of the next Deepak Chopra.

Back in India, Tugginmypudha tells Pitka that he has finally learned to love himself and removes Pitka's chastity belt, revealing there was just a hook in the back. The film ends with Jane and Pitka dancing together in a Bollywood-style number to a rendition of "The Joker".

== Cast ==
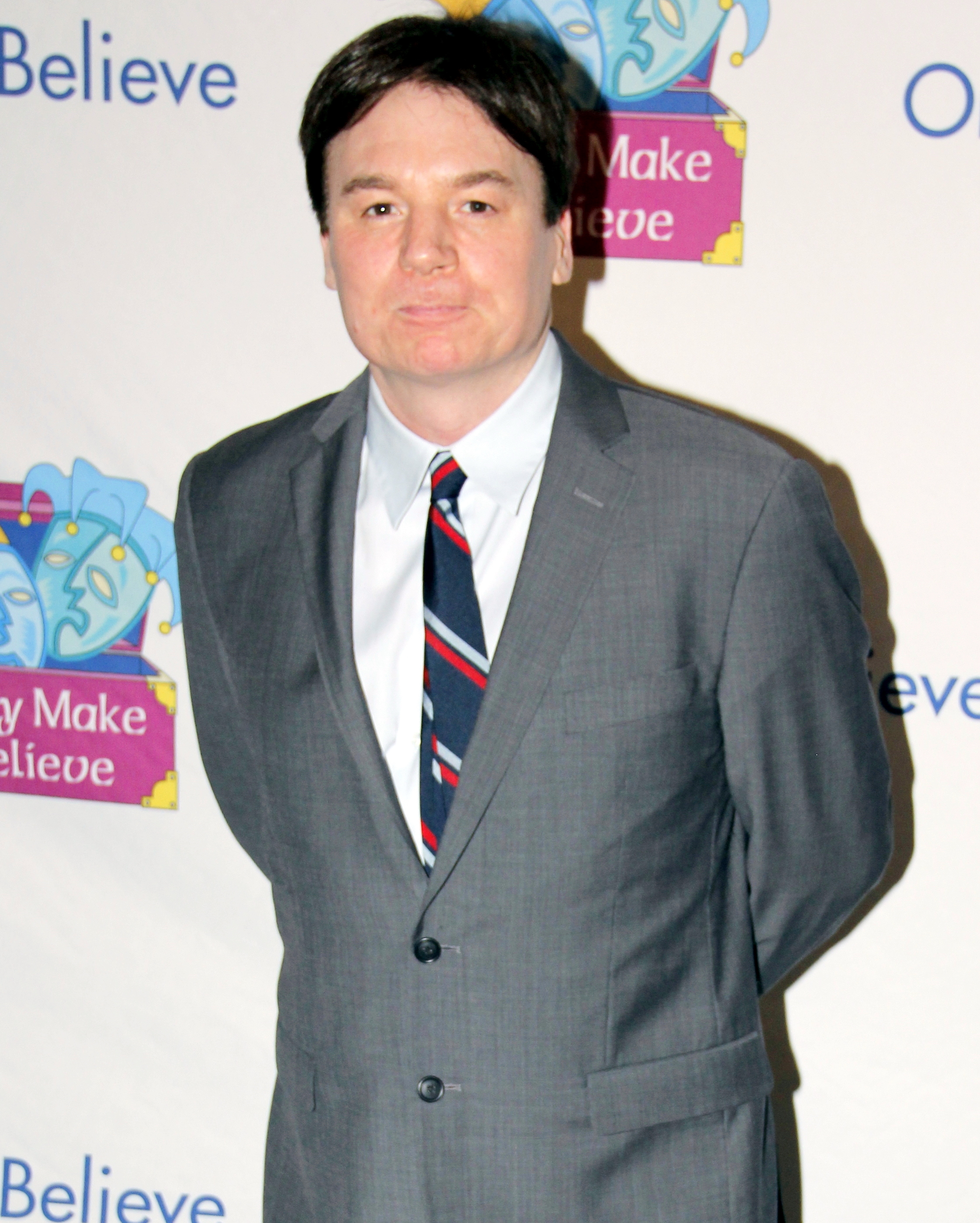
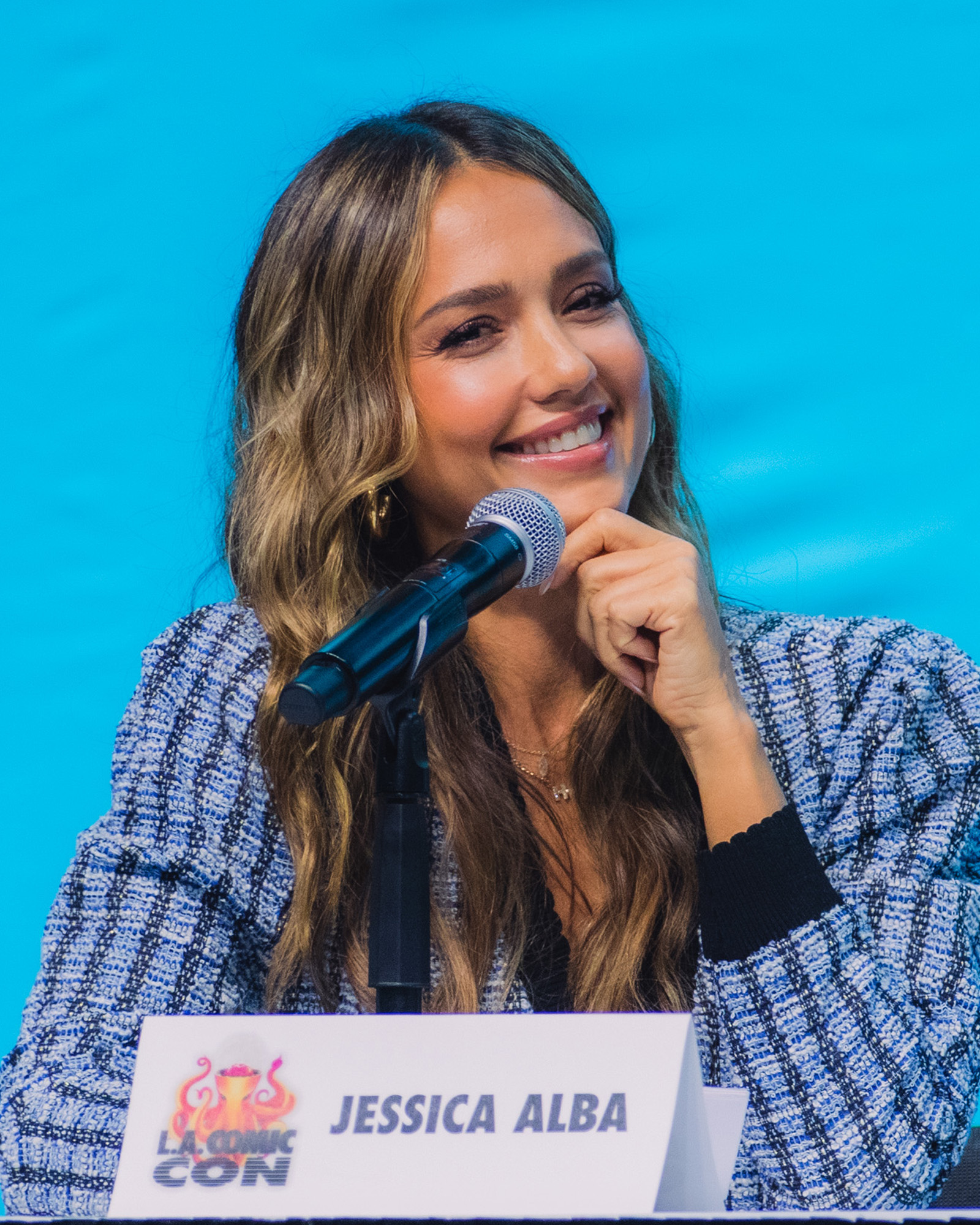
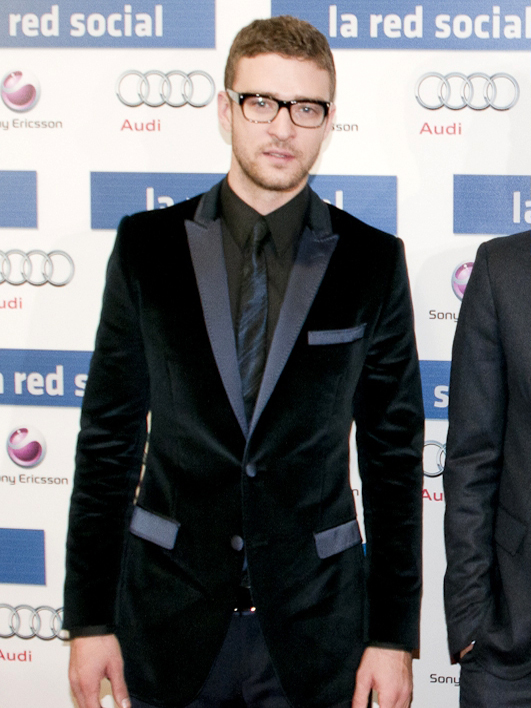
Mike Myers (pictured in 2011), Jessica Alba (2025) and Justin Timberlake (2010)
- Mike Myers as Guru Maurice Pitka / Himself – Pitka is the 2nd top guru behind Deepak Chopra. After his parents, two dog stylists turned missionaries, had died when he was 12, he is sent to live in a small village in India. He initially aspires to be a guru to be a lothario. His guru has him forced into a vow of celibacy until he learns self-love and many other humiliating tasks. Thirty-three years later, in the present, with a chance to finally be on The Oprah Winfrey Show, he is hired to travel to America to fix the relationship between Darren and Prudence.
- Jessica Alba as Jane Bullard, the owner of the Toronto Maple Leafs, an heir to her father, who died. She is disliked by fans of the team, but she is a big fan of Pitka's work, helping her through her grief with her father. She is also attracted to him. He falls in love with her at first sight.
- Justin Timberlake as Jacques "Le Coq" Grandé, the rival goalie. He is dating Darren's wife. He is famous for being well-endowed.
- Romany Malco as Darren Roanoke. With his love life in shambles, Pitka aids him in fixing his relationship.
- Meagan Good as Prudence Roanoke, Darren's wife and Jacques's lover.
- Verne Troyer as Coach Punch Cherkov, the coach of the Maple Leafs. He is irritable and dislikes Pitka due to his cruel jokes about his dwarfism.
- Ben Kingsley as Guru Tugginmypudha, the quirky guru of Pitka. He is severely cross-eyed due to excessive masturbation.
- Omid Djalili as Guru Satchabigknoba / Gagandeep Singh, a rival guru to Pitka. His scenes were cut from the film.
- Telma Hopkins as Lillian Roanoke, Darren's overbearing mother.
- John Oliver as Richard "Dick" Pants, Pitka's greedy agent.
- Manu Narayan as Rajneesh, Pitka's assistant and closest friend.
- Stephen Colbert as Jay Kell, an NHL hockey announcer and drug addict.
- Jim Gaffigan as Trent Lueders, an NHL hockey announcer.
- Rob Huebel as Bar Patron
- Daniel Tosh as Cowboy Hat
- Samantha Bee as Cinnabon Cashier

=== As themselves ===
- Jessica Simpson
- Kanye West
- Deepak Chopra
- Rob Blake
- Mariska Hargitay (uncredited)
- Val Kilmer (uncredited)
- Oprah Winfrey (voice)

== Music ==
The original score for the film was composed by George S. Clinton, who also composed the score for the Austin Powers films, also starring, written, and produced by Mike Myers. Clinton recorded it with an eighty-piece ensemble of the Hollywood Studio Symphony at Warner Bros.

The song "Dhadak Dhadak" from the Bollywood film of 2005, Bunty Aur Babli, was used in the trailer.

The songs "9 to 5", "More Than Words", and "The Joker" are all in the film (performed by Myers and with sitar accompaniment) and on the soundtrack. "Brimful of Asha" was also used in the film.

== Production ==
Mike Myers first came up with the idea for Guru Pitka in the mid-1990s. The character was originally planned for the Austin Powers franchise. Myers began workshopping the character in New York comedy clubs in 2005. He billed these live shows as "An Evening With His Holiness the Guru Pitka". Myers said, "about a third of the audience were friends of mine who would come. A third of the audience would be people that had heard that I was doing it. And a third would be people thinking they were coming to see an actual guru. I did that for a year and I videotaped them and it informed me." Myers wore a prosthetic nose for the character both in the live performances and in the film.

The Love Guru was in part inspired by Myers' career-long desire to make a hockey movie. A fan of the Toronto Maple Leafs, Myers described the film's plot as wish fulfillment, saying, "I figure the only way that my team will win a Cup is if I write it."

First-time director Marco Schnabel had previously worked with Myers as a second unit director on the Austin Powers series, most notably Austin Powers in Goldmember. The Love Guru filmed in Toronto in August 2007. It was intended to start a franchise.

John Oliver made his feature film debut in The Love Guru and was cast due to Myers enjoying The Daily Show. Samantha Bee filmed a cameo but only makes a silent appearance in the final cut of the film. Dialogue for her character is included in a bonus feature of deleted scenes contained on the film's home media release.

== Promotion ==
Myers appeared in the seventh season finale of American Idol as Pitka, the "spiritual director" of that show. The finalists David Cook and David Archuleta got to visit the Paramount Pictures studio theatre to see The Love Guru a month before its release and then got to meet Myers dressed like Pitka and playing "Sitar Hero".

A "Fan Resource Page" at Fox Entertainment's beliefnet.com website was "created as part of a collaboration between Beliefnet and Paramount Pictures."

== Reception ==
=== Box office ===
The film did poorly at the box office. In its opening weekend, The Love Guru grossed $13.9 million in 3,012 theaters in the United States and Canada, ranking #4 at the box office behind Get Smart, The Incredible Hulk, and Kung Fu Panda, falling short of the $20 million range forecast by Hollywood pundits. The film grossed $32.2 million in the United States and Canada and an additional $8.7 million overseas, for a total of $40.8 million worldwide, against its $62 million budget. When the film was released in the United Kingdom, it ranked only #8 on the opening weekend.

=== Critical response ===
On the review aggregator website Rotten Tomatoes, 13% of 177 critics' reviews are positive, with an average rating of 3.5/10. The website's consensus reads: "The Love Guru features far too many gross-out gags, and too few earned laughs, ranking as one of Mike Myers' poorest outings." Metacritic, which uses a weighted average, assigned the film a score of 24 out of 100, based on 33 critics, indicating "generally unfavorable" reviews. Audiences polled by CinemaScore gave the film a grade "B -" on scale of A to F.

Jay Stone of the National Post gave the film one star and said the film "is shockingly crass, sloppy, repetitive and thin." Stone said, "Chopra is used almost as a product placement, taking a proud spot alongside a circus, a brand of cinnamon buns, the Leafs and, of course, Mike Myers." Stone also wrote, "the sitar based versions of pop songs like '9 to 5' are oddly watchable – but mostly the film is 88 minutes of ridiculous sight gags and obscene puns."

A. O. Scott of The New York Times wrote "The word 'unfunny' surely applies to Mr. Myers's obnoxious attempts to find mirth in physical and cultural differences but does not quite capture the strenuous unpleasantness of his performance. No, The Love Guru is downright antifunny, an experience that makes you wonder if you will ever laugh again." Scott also commented that the appearance of actress Mariska Hargitay was anticlimactic. An ongoing gag in the film is the use of "Mariska Hargitay" as a phony Hindi greeting.

Roger Ebert gave the film 1 out of 4 stars, writing, "Myers has made some funny movies, but this film could have been written on toilet walls by callow adolescents. Every reference to a human sex organ or process of defecation is not automatically funny simply because it is naughty, but Myers seems to labor under that delusion."

Harry Knowles of Ain't It Cool News wrote a highly negative review, saying The Love Guru "isn't merely a bad film, but a painful experience." He considered it one of the worst films of at least the past several years and also declared it might ruin Myers's career.

Mick LaSalle of San Francisco Chronicle was one of the few major critics who did not write the film off completely, stating "Mike Myers' new comedy, "The Love Guru," is a disappointment, but it's not a disaster, and that's at least something."

Myers later poked fun at the film's failure in an appearance on the December 20, 2014 episode of Saturday Night Live, where he appeared as Dr. Evil (a character from his far more successful Austin Powers series), advising Sony Pictures on its cancellation of the release of The Interview: "if you really want to put a bomb in a theater, do what I did: put in The Love Guru."

=== Accolades ===
Award	Ceremony date	Category	Subject	Result
Golden Raspberry Awards	February 21, 2009	Worst Picture	Gary Barber, Michael De Luca and Mike Myers	Won
Golden Raspberry Awards	February 21, 2009	Worst Director	Marco Schnabel	Nominated
Golden Raspberry Awards	February 21, 2009	Worst Actor	Mike Myers	Won
Golden Raspberry Awards	February 21, 2009	Worst Actress	Jessica Alba	Nominated
Golden Raspberry Awards	February 21, 2009	Worst Supporting Actor	Ben Kingsley	Nominated
Golden Raspberry Awards	February 21, 2009	Worst Supporting Actor	Verne Troyer	Nominated
Golden Raspberry Awards	February 21, 2009	Worst Screenplay	Mike Myers and Graham Gordy	Won
Golden Raspberry Awards	March 6, 2010	Worst Actor of the Decade	Mike Myers (also for The Cat in the Hat)	Nominated

== Portrayal of Hinduism ==
Before the film's release, The Love Guru provoked mixed responses among Hindus. Some expressed unhappiness about how Hindus are portrayed in the film, believing The Love Guru was disrespectful and risked giving Hinduism a bad reputation among viewers not familiar with the faith. Other Hindus, such as an official statement from the International Society for Krishna Consciousness, gave the film a cautious welcome, saying the film "does not intend to hurt religious sentiments" and asking critics to see the film as satire and not a literal representation of Hinduism.

Rajan Zed, a Hindu cleric from Nevada, asked that Paramount Pictures screen the film for members of the Hindu community before its release. Based on Zed's interpretation of the movie's trailer and MySpace page, he said The Love Guru "appears to be lampooning Hinduism and Hindus" and risked reinforcing harmful stereotypes. Professor Diane Winston, an expert on media and religion, said the film was seemingly more a critique of American attitudes towards "quick spiritual fixes" rather than a sustained satire of Hinduism.

Paramount Pictures agreed to provide the Hindu American Foundation (HAF) an opportunity to pre-screen the film as soon as it had a complete work print of the film, but ultimately did not follow through with this plan. Instead, Paramount requested representatives of the Foundation attend a Minneapolis pre-screening the night before the film's release. HAF agreed to view the film after many requests from American Hindus who were concerned about the film. HAF reviewers concluded The Love Guru was vulgar and crude but not "mean-spirited" or necessarily anti-Hindu.

== See also ==
- List of films about ice hockey
