= Elisha Cuthbert =

Canadian actress (born 1982)

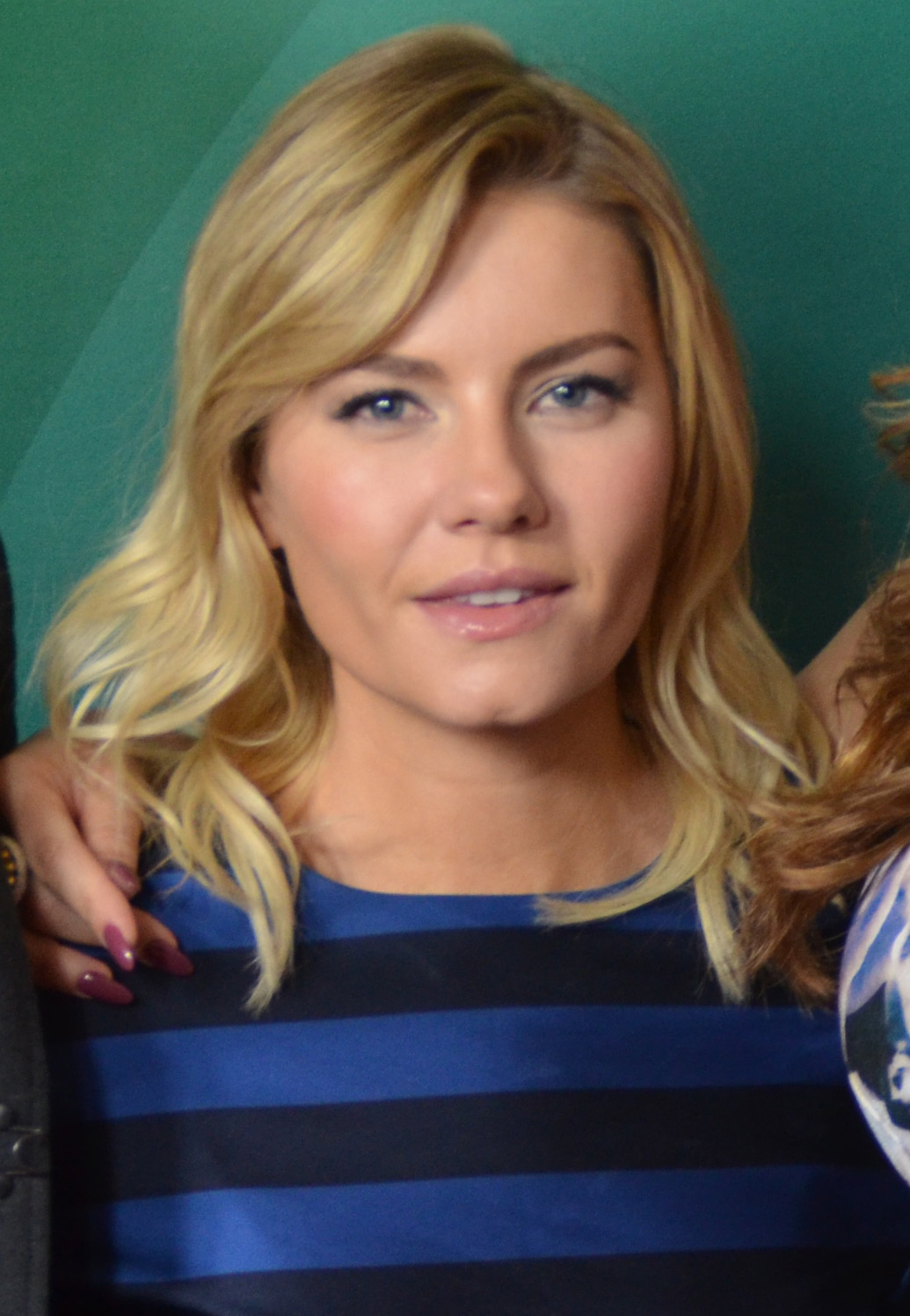
- Cuthbert in 2015
- Born: Elisha Ann Cuthbert; November 30, 1982 (age 43); Calgary, Alberta, Canada
- Occupation: Actress
- Years active: 1996–present
- Spouse: Dion Phaneuf (m. 2013)
- Children: 2

Elisha Ann Cuthbert (/əˈliːʃə/; born November 30, 1982) is a Canadian actress. As a child actress, she made her first televised appearance as an extra on Are You Afraid of the Dark? and co-hosted Popular Mechanics for Kids. She made her feature-film debut in the 1997 Canadian family drama Dancing on the Moon. Her first major lead role came in the 1998 drama film Airspeed alongside Joe Mantegna. In 2001, she starred in the movie Lucky Girl, for which she received her first award, the Gemini Awards.

After moving to Hollywood in 2001, she was cast as Kim Bauer in the series 24, her first big role in an American production, alongside Kiefer Sutherland. For this role, she was nominated for Screen Actors Guild Awards twice. In 2003, she played Darcie Goldberg in the college comedy Old School and Carol-Anne in Love Actually. Cuthbert received wide recognition for her breakout role as Danielle in the 2004 teen comedy film The Girl Next Door, being nominated for Best Breakthrough Performance at the 2005 MTV Movie Awards, and for her next role as Carly Jones in 2005's House of Wax, for which she received two nominations for the Teen Choice Awards, including Best Actress: Action/Adventure/Thriller. Subsequently, Cuthbert appeared in the lead role in the drama The Quiet (2005) and the horror Captivity (2007). This role, along with Are You Afraid of the Dark?, 24 series and House of Wax, established her as a scream queen.

From 2011 to 2013, Cuthbert starred as Alex Kerkovich in the three seasons of the ABC comedy Happy Endings. From 2016 to 2020, she had a recurring role as Abby Phillips on the Netflix series The Ranch, before becoming a main cast member in the series' second season. She received praise for her performance on the Canadian comedy series Jann (2020), being nominated for the Canadian Screen Awards for Best Performance in a guest role.

Cuthbert has appeared in numerous magazines, such as Maxim, Complex, and FHM. In 2013, Maxim magazine named her "TV's most beautiful woman".

== Early life ==
Elisha Cuthbert was born in Calgary, Alberta. Her father worked as an automotive design engineer, and her mother was a homemaker. Cuthbert grew up with her younger brother and younger sister in Greenfield Park, Quebec, a suburb of Montreal. As a result, she speaks both English and French.

In 2000, she graduated from Centennial Regional High School and moved to Los Angeles at the age of 17. As a child, she participated in Girl Guide programs as a member of Girl Guides of Canada.

== Career ==
=== Early work ===
When she was six, Cuthbert began modeling children's clothing while appearing as a foot model.

In 1995, she made her first televised appearance as an extra on Are You Afraid of the Dark? and later became a regular on the show in 1999. Cuthbert co-hosted Popular Mechanics for Kids with Jay Baruchel, filmed in Montreal. Her reporting captured the attention of Hillary Clinton, who invited her to the White House.

Cuthbert landed a role in a feature film in the family drama Dancing on the Moon (1997). She appeared in other Canadian family films and in an airplane thriller, Airspeed. In 2000, Cuthbert co-starred in Believe, a Canadian film with Ricky Mabe. The following year she starred in the Canadian television movie, Lucky Girl, and was awarded a Gemini Award for her performance.

=== 2000s ===
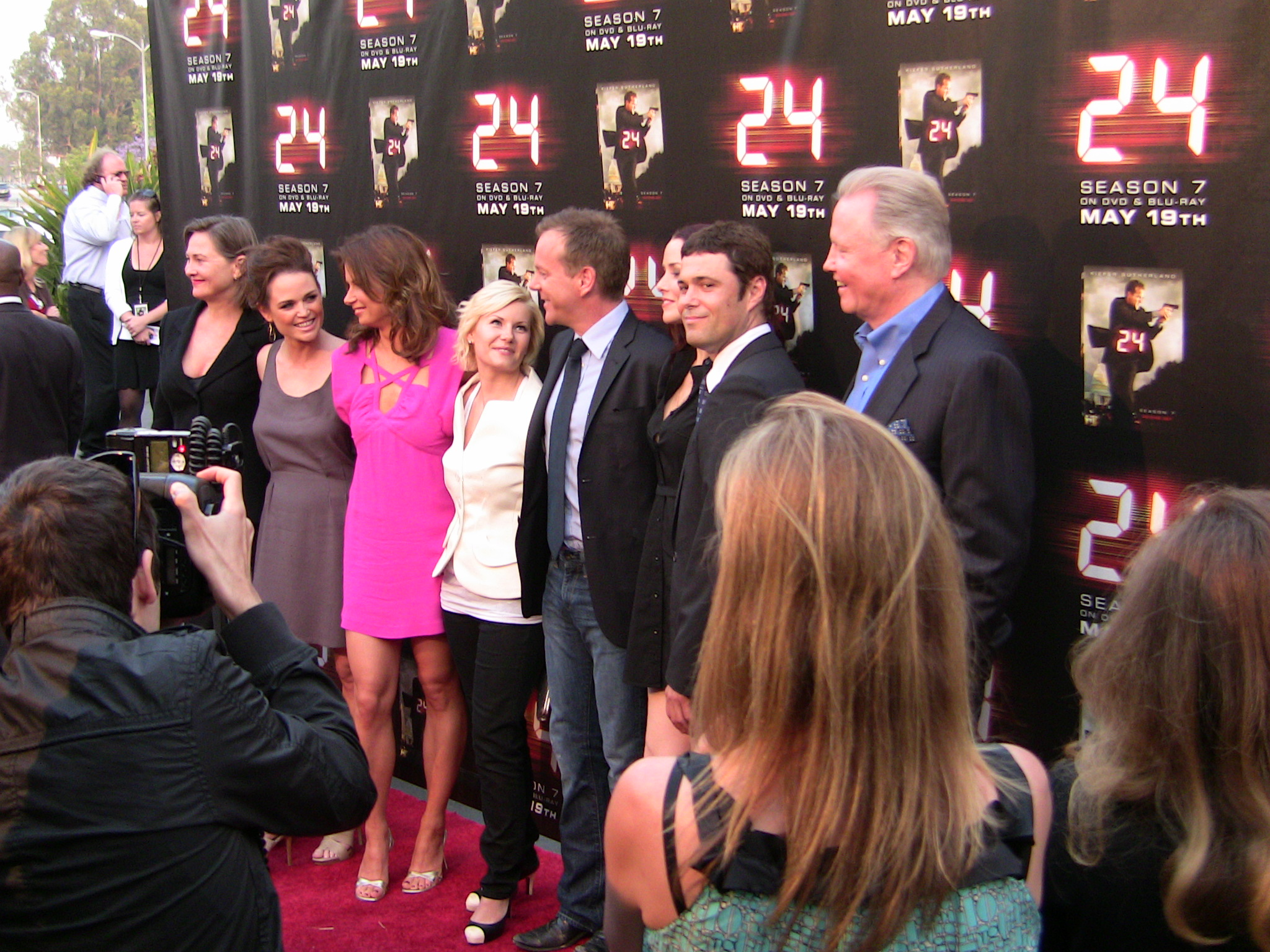
Cuthbert with cast of 24 at a screening for the 24 season 7 finale

Six months after moving to Hollywood, she was cast as Kim Bauer, daughter of federal agent Jack Bauer, in the television series 24. She appeared in the show's first three seasons, but not in its fourth; she guest-starred in two episodes in the fifth season. She also reprised her role as Kim Bauer in 24: The Game and again guest-starred in five episodes of the seventh season and in two episodes of the eighth season. Speaking about her experience working on the series, Cuthbert said in 2026: "It's hard to imagine, really, the scope of it. It was a whirlwind, too. I mean, the success of it all was overwhelming and thrilling and exciting. I have great memories of that time, but also, it was really intense too. We were working so much that the one-hour format... especially with all the action and all the intense night shoots, I mean, it was not an easy show to film. It was a well-oiled machine, but it still was a grueling schedule. I don't know if I'd have the energy to partake in that again."

She began her Hollywood film career with small roles in Old School, which grossed $87 million. Cuthbert next appeared in Love Actually, which earned $246.4 million worldwide.

Her first break in a major film role was in 2004, The Girl Next Door. She played an ex–porn star, Danielle, opposite Emile Hirsch. She had reservations about taking the part, but director Luke Greenfield persuaded her to accept the role. Cuthbert did research for the film speaking to adult actresses from Wicked Pictures and Vivid Entertainment. The film was compared to Risky Business, although Cuthbert said her character was not directly based on Rebecca De Mornay's. Critics were divided; some praised the film for boldness, while others, notably Roger Ebert, called it gimmicky and exploitative. Ebert wrote that he saw Cuthbert's character as "quite the most unpleasant character I have seen in some time." The View London said: "Cuthbert is surprisingly good, too – aside from being drop dead gorgeous, she also proves herself a capable comic actress in the Cameron Diaz mould". Cuthbert won two nominations for the MTV Movie Awards for Best Kiss and Best Breakthrough Performance. Reflecting on making the movie, Cuthbert later said in 2026: "When I think about that movie and that character, it feels so foreign to me. It was such a departure for me, and it actually took a lot of confidence to push myself to make that happen. What some people think is me is just so the opposite. I was so nervous, so shy and didn't feel sexy at all for so long but it's still a lovely movie, and I'm proud of it. I'm glad people still enjoy it."

In her next film, Cuthbert starred with Paris Hilton and Chad Michael Murray in the 2005 remake of the horror film House of Wax. House of Wax was largely panned, critics citing a range of flaws. It was called "notable for having some of the most moronic protagonists ever to populate a horror film", though of those characters, critics tended to think Cuthbert "did the best". Though it received negative reviews the film was a box office success, which grossed $70 million worldwide. The Houston Chronicle cited Cuthbert as an exception. Mick LaSalle of the San Francisco Chronicle said of the film, "Elisha Cuthbert's matter-of-fact, likable quality helps. Seeing her turn into wax would be as bad as seeing that happen to Glenda Farrell (the star of the 1933 version)." The Movie said: "The performances are always professional and understated in their believable cogency, particularly Cuthbert, a talented, beautiful young actress who has proven time and again just what a multilayered and promising future she has ahead of her. Cuthbert digs into the role of Carly with strength, determination, and horrified realism; you believe as you watch her that she is going through these things and forget all about the actor playing the part, which is the biggest compliment of all. Brian Orndorf of Filmjerk.com said: "[Paris] Hilton ... only plays her known personality in the film. She's overshadowed by the strong work from the rest of the cast, notably Chad Michael Murray and especially Elisha Cuthbert, who gives the film a strong dose of enthusiasm with her Jamie Lee Curtis-esque performance." Cuthbert was nominated at Teen Choice Awards in two categories Choice Movie: Actress – Action / Adventure / Thriller and Choice Movie: Rumble.

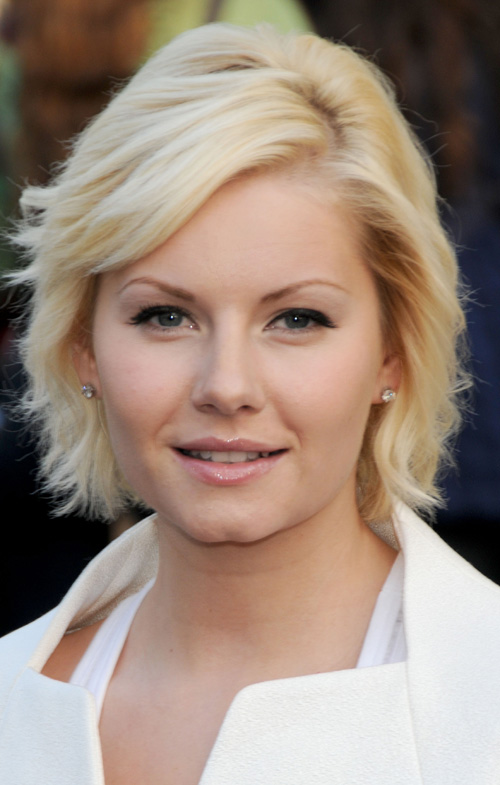
Cuthbert promoting 24 in May 2009

Cuthbert's next film was the indie film The Quiet. She was a co-star and co-producer. She played Nina, a 17-year-old cheerleader who is sexually abused by her father. Cuthbert looked to her younger cousin as her inspiration in portraying a teenager. The Quiet, distributed by Sony Pictures Classics, premiered at the 2005 Toronto International Film Festival and received a limited release in Los Angeles and New York City on 25 August 2006 before expanding regionally in the US on September 1. Cuthbert initially wanted to play the part of the silent Dot, but director Jamie Babbit cast Camilla Belle in the role instead after Thora Birch pulled out. Babbit reasoned "To me, Dot has to be someone you could believe would be invisible in high school. You look at Elisha, this beautiful woman with the most perfect body you've ever seen, and you think, there's no high school in America where this girl could be invisible. No matter how much hair and makeup I do, it's not going to happen." The Daily Californian conceded that "Despite the plot's failings, Cuthbert does a convincing job in her role, exuding an outer shell so tough that when her inner, softer layers emerge, it's a natural change of character. Empire Movies agreed, commenting "this is Elisha Cuthbert's best film performance to date. Cuthbert's Nina has the majority of the most graphic and disturbing dialogue in the film, especially during one particular lunchroom scene where the camera is close up on Cuthbert and Belle's faces."

Cuthbert appeared in the music video for Weezer's "Perfect Situation" in early 2006, playing the group's fictional original singer who threw a tantrum that led to Rivers Cuomo, the roadie, becoming the band's frontman. She also had a small role in Paris Hilton's music video for the song "Nothing in This World".

In 2007, Cuthbert appeared in Captivity, a thriller centered on a fashion model taunted by a psychopath who imprisons her in a cellar. She was nominated for a Razzie award as Worst Actress and Teen Choice Awards for Choice Movie Actress: Horror/Thriller for the movie. The film grossed $10.9 million at the box office. The critic Stephen Whitty of the Newark Star-Ledger said, "When, in the last few minutes, Cuthbert finally slipped her bonds and began looking for her tormentors, I knew exactly how she felt." The View London said: "The worst Cuthbert struggles to make her character sympathetic because the script doesn't give her anything to work with, while Daniel Gillies is too creepy-looking to convince as a potential love interest."

In He Was a Quiet Man, Cuthbert played Vanessa, a quadriplegic; she starred alongside Christian Slater. The film was in limited release in 2007, and it was released on DVD in early 2008. The critic Peter Bradshaw in his review for The Guardian praised Cuthbert's performance, writing that she "is very good". In 2008, Cuthbert appeared in My Sassy Girl, a remake of a Korean film, starring with Jesse Bradford. Nikhat Kazmi of The Times of India said the "Elisha is cute and their zany affair keeps the reels rolling in an unusual love story with the usual heartbreak and happy home-comings". Although Lacey Mical (Callahan) Walker of Christian Spotlight on Entertainment was not impressed by Bradford performance, she praised Cuthbert's, saying, "Elisha Cuthbert's talent rises above the character she was given to play, and she almost saves the bitter first half with a stellar performance".

Her next film was the family comedy The Six Wives of Henry Lefay, with Tim Allen, in which she played his daughter. She starred in the Canadian miniseries Guns. She was a judge in season two, episode two of Project Runway Canada. Designers were challenged to create a "party dress" for her. Cuthbert reprised her character Kim Bauer in the seventh season of 24 for five episodes. She was to star in the CBS drama pilot Ny-Lon, playing a New York literacy teacher/record-store clerk who embarks on a transatlantic romance with a London stockbroker. The project, based on a British series starring Rashida Jones and Stephen Moyer, was cancelled.

In December 2009, ABC said Cuthbert had joined the cast of The Forgotten in a recurring role as Maxine Denver, a Chicago professional. It was expected for Cuthbert to play the role of Trixie in sports action- comedy film Speed Racer (2008), but Christina Ricci was eventually chosen.

=== 2010s ===
From April 2011 to May 2013, Cuthbert starred as Alex Kerkovich for three seasons on the ABC ensemble comedy Happy Endings alongside Eliza Coupe, Zachary Knighton, Adam Pally, Damon Wayans Jr., and Casey Wilson. Despite critical acclaim and having a cult following, the show was canceled by ABC after the conclusion of its third season on 3 May 2013. Cuthbert was nominated for the Online Film & Television Association Award in 2012 and 2013 in the category of "Best Cast in a Comedy Series" and TV Guide Awards for Favorite Cast. The series was also nominated for 28 other awards including the Satellite Awards for Best Series comedy television or music. Cuthbert's performance received positive reviews from critics. In 2013, she was regarded as a promising contender for an Emmy Award in the Outstanding Supporting Actress in a Comedy Series category, however she was not nominated. In 2026, Cuthbert went on to say that "Happy Endings would probably be the one (project I worked on) that brings a smile to my face the most. It was just a fun time for me. I was in my late 20s, early 30s — it was just a really good place to be. And then to be able to do comedy with five other actors who were all around the same age, it was maybe too much fun. We really had a blast working together on that show."

Around that time, Cuthbert was host of the American Music Awards in 2012. She also appeared in The Gaslight Anthem's music video "Here Comes My Man". Lastly, she appeared on the cover of Maxim, which named her TV's Most Beautiful Woman in 2013.

In February 2014, Cuthbert signed to play the female lead role in Liz Feldman and Ellen DeGeneres' NBC sitcom pilot One Big Happy However, the series was cancelled after one season. In 2015, Cuthbert was cast opposite Seann William Scott in Goon: Last of the Enforcers, a sequel to Goon..

In 2016, Cuthbert joined the cast of Netflix's The Ranch, a comedy series. The show was highly successful and ended in 2020 after four seasons.

=== 2020s ===
Between 2020 and 2021, she shot and starred in the films Eat Wheaties!, The Cellar, Bandit, and the comedy Friday Afternoon in the Universe. For her performance in the comedy series Jann (2020), she was nominated for the Canadian Screen Awards for Best Guest Performance.

After 2021, Cuthbert took a four year hiatus from acting to focus on raising her children, specifically her newborn second child. Cuthbert's first major project post-hiatus was a recurring role on the television series Every Year After (2026). On returning to acting with that project, Cuthbert explained: "The show is so beautiful, and I get to play a mother, which felt correct on so many levels. To come out and be back on a show like this that feels right for me — and Sue is just so joyful and loving and maternal — it all felt really organic and great. It was a nice, smooth transition back to work. It was refreshing."

== Public image ==
After Cuthbert began playing Kim Bauer, she was often included on lists of the "hottest women" published by magazines and websites. Her highest rank in FHM came in 2008, when she was ranked No. 4 on the 100 Sexiest Women in the World list in the UK edition. (Note: Attributed to multiple references:) She was included on Maxim's Hot 100 list ten times between 2002 and 2013. (Note: Attributed to multiple references:) In 2013, Maxim named her the Most Beautiful Woman in Television.

Cuthbert was ranked No. 10 by AskMen.com readers in the list "Top 99 Women of 2007". BuddyTV ranked her No. 33 on its TV's 100 Sexiest Women of 2011 list, No. 13 in 2012, and No. 30 in 2015. She was included in the list of The 15 Best Comedy Supporting Actresses of the 2011–2012 TV Season and 2012–2013 TV Season. The Canadian Business named her one of the most powerful Canadians in Hollywood, and the New York Daily News listed her as one of the Sexiest Canadian celebrities of 2016.

Complex has ranked her in The 25 Hottest Canadian Women, The 100 Hottest Women of the 2000s, The 25 Hottest Blonde Bombshell Actresses, and The 50 Hottest Celebrity Sports Fans. In 2013, GQ magazine listed her among The 100 Hottest Women of the 21st Century and The 100 Sexiest Women of the Millennium.

== Personal life ==
Cuthbert has two younger siblings and enjoys painting. She is also an ice hockey fan.

Cuthbert and ice hockey player Dion Phaneuf, then the captain of the Toronto Maple Leafs, announced their engagement in September 2012 and married on July 6, 2013, at St. James Catholic Church in Summerfield, Prince Edward Island. Living in Ottawa during the ice hockey season, Cuthbert and Phaneuf spend their summers at their waterfront estate outside New London, Prince Edward Island, his parents' home province. The couple have two children, a daughter born in 2017 and a son in 2022. In July 2025, Cuthbert listed her home in Hollywood Hills for $3.2 million.

== Filmography ==
=== Film ===
Year	Title	Role	Notes
1997	Dancing on the Moon	Sarah	
1997	Nico the Unicorn	Carolyn Price	
1998	Airspeed	Nicole Stone	
1999	Believe	Katherine Winslowe	
1999	Time at the Top	Susan Shawson	
2000	Who Gets the House?	Emily Reece	
2003	Love Actually	American Goddess Carol	
2003	Old School	Darcie Goldberg	
2004	The Girl Next Door	Danielle	
2005	House of Wax	Carly Jones	
2005	The Quiet	Nina Deer	Also associate producer
2007	Captivity	Jennifer Tree	
2007	He Was a Quiet Man	Vanessa	
2008	My Sassy Girl	Jordan Roark	
2008	Guns	Frances Dett	
2009	The Six Wives of Henry Lefay	Barbara "Barby" Lefay	
2014	Just Before I Go	Penny Morgan	
2017	Goon: Last of the Enforcers	Mary	
2020	Eat Wheaties!	Janet Berry-Straw	
2022	The Cellar	Keira Woods	
2022	Bandit	Andrea	
2022	Friday Afternoon in the Universe	Eleanor	
2026	Silent Night Fall	Grace	Post-production

=== Television ===
Year	Title	Role	Notes
1997–2000	Popular Mechanics for Kids	Herself	Host
1996, 1999–2000	Are You Afraid of the Dark?	Young Girl ("The Tale of the Night Shift") / Megan	Main role, 25 episodes
2000	Mail to the Chief	Madison Osgood	Television film
2001	Largo Winch	Abby	Episode: "Dear Abby"
2001	Lucky Girl	Katlin Palmerson	Television film; also known as My Daughter's Secret Life
2001–2010	24	Kim Bauer	Main role (season 1–3), Recurring role (season 5, 7–8); 79 episodes
2004	MADtv	Herself / Kim Bauer	1 episode: 24 parody
2006	Punk'd	Herself	Episode dated: "April 17, 2006"
2008	Tim and Eric Awesome Show, Great Job!	Herself	Episode: "Jim and Derrick"
2008	NY-LON	Edie	Failed television pilot
2008	Family Guy	New Bedford (voice)	Episode: "Tales of a Third Grade Nothing"
2009	Project Runway Canada	Herself	Guest Judge, episode: "Claim to Fame"
2010	The Forgotten	Maxine Denver	Recurring role, 6 episodes
2011–2013	Happy Endings	Alex Kerkovich	Main role, 57 episodes
2015	One Big Happy	Lizzy	Main role, 6 episodes
2016–2020	The Ranch	Abby Phillips-Bennett	Recurring role (season 1); main role (seasons 2–4)
2020	Canada's Drag Race	Herself	Guest judge, Episode: "Eh-laganza Eh-xtravaganza"
2020	Jann	Liz	Guest host, episode: "Tomato, Tomato" (season 2)
2025	Monster in the Family: The Stacey Kananen Story	Stacey Kananen	Television film
2026	Every Year After	Sue Florek	Recurring role

=== Web ===
Year	Title	Role	Notes
2012	Happy Endings: Happy Rides	Alex Kerkovich	Directed 1 episode
2015	The Plateaus	Elisha	2 episodes; web series

=== Music videos ===
Year	Title	Artist	Role	Notes	Ref.
2004	"She Will Be Loved" (Version 1)	Maroon 5	Love Interest	Appearing in the unfinished first version.	
2005	"Perfect Situation"	Weezer	Lead Singer of "Weeze"		
2006	"Nothing in This World"	Paris Hilton	Popular Girl	Cameo appearance	
2012	"Here Comes My Man"	The Gaslight Anthem	Girlfriend		
2015	"Make Our Own Way" (Theme from One Big Happy)	Little Brutes	Herself		

=== Video games ===
Year	Title	Role
2006	24: The Game	Kim Bauer

== Awards and nominations ==
Award/association	Year	Category	Nominated work	Result	Ref.
Canadian Screen Awards	2021	Best Performance of a guest role in a Comedy Series	Jann	Nominated	
Gemini Awards	2001	Best Performance by an Actress in a Leading Role in a Dramatic Program or Mini-Series	Lucky Girl	Won	
Golden Raspberry Awards	2008	Worst Actress	Captivity	Nominated	
MTV Movie Awards	2005	Best Kiss	The Girl Next Door	Nominated	
MTV Movie Awards	2005	Best Breakthrough Performance, Female	The Girl Next Door	Nominated	
Online Film Critics Society	2002	Best Cast in a Drama Series	24	Nominated	
Online Film Critics Society	2003	Best Cast in a Drama Series	24	Won	
Online Film & Television Association Award	2003	Best Ensemble	Love Actually	Nominated	
Online Film & Television Association Award	2006	Best Cast in a Drama Series	24	Nominated	
Online Film & Television Association Award	2009	Best Cast in a Drama Series	24	Nominated	
Online Film & Television Association Award	2012	Best Ensemble in a Comedy series	Happy Endings	Nominated	
Screen Actors Guild Awards	2004	Outstanding Performance by an Ensemble in a Drama Series	24	Nominated	
Screen Actors Guild Awards	2006	Outstanding Performance by an Ensemble in a Drama Series	24	Nominated	
Spike Video Game Awards	2006	Best Female Interpretation of a Supporting Character	24: The Game	Nominated	
Teen Choice Awards	2003	Choice TV: Female Breakout Star	24	Nominated	
Teen Choice Awards	2005	Choice Movie Actress: Action/Thriller	House of Wax	Nominated	
Teen Choice Awards	2005	Choice Movie: Rumble	House of Wax	Nominated	
Teen Choice Awards	2007	Choice Movie Actress: Horror/Thriller	Captivity	Nominated	
Washington D.C. Area Film Critics Association	2003	Best Ensemble	Love Actually	Won	
