= The Quiet =

- Original promotional poster
- Directed by: Jamie Babbit
- Written by: Abdi Nazemian; Micah Schraft
- Produced by: Carolyn Pfeiffer; Joel Michaely; Holly Wiersma; Andrea Sperling
- Starring: Elisha Cuthbert; Camilla Belle; Martin Donovan; Edie Falco; Katy Mixon; Shawn Ashmore
- Cinematography: M. David Mullen
- Edited by: Joan Sobel
- Music by: Jeff Rona
- Production companies: Town Lake Films; Burnt Orange Productions
- Distributed by: Sony Pictures Classics
- Release dates: September 12, 2005 (TIFF); August 25, 2006 (United States)
- Running time: 92 minutes
- Country: United States
- Languages: English; American Sign Language
- Budget: $900,000
- Box office: $381,420

The Quiet is a 2005 American psychological thriller film directed by Jamie Babbit, written by Abdi Nazemian and Micah Schraft, and starring Elisha Cuthbert, Camilla Belle, Martin Donovan, and Edie Falco. It focuses on a deaf-mute teenage orphan who is sent to live with her godparents. She soon becomes a sounding board for the family members, who confess their darkest secrets to her, including the father's ongoing sexual abuse of his daughter.

The second feature film by Babbit after the 1999 comedy But I'm a Cheerleader, The Quiet was shot in Austin, Texas in 2004, the first film by the University of Texas's Burnt Orange production company. Cuthbert served as an associate producer of the film. Its soundtrack features songs by Low, Cat Power, Le Tigre, and numerous Beethoven piano sonatas. The film premiered at the 2005 Toronto International Film Festival before being acquired by Destination Films, which re-edited the film drastically and added voiceover narration before releasing it in the United States theatrically through Sony Pictures Classics in August 2006.

The film was a box-office flop, but it found bigger commercial success in DVD markets. Many critics at the time of its release dismissed it as sleazy, exploitative, and difficult to watch, with several noting that it was too serious to be satire, yet too campy to be taken seriously. In the years since its release, the film has been analyzed by writers and critics as an example of a modern suburban gothic horror film.

== Plot ==
Following the accidental death of her deaf father, Dot, an orphaned teenager who is also deaf-mute, is sent to live in Meriden, Connecticut, with her upper-class godparents, Paul and Olivia Deer, and their teenage daughter, Nina. Dot and Nina had been friends in childhood, before Dot lost her hearing as a result of a medical condition. The aloof Nina resents Dot's presence in the home and insults her repeatedly. Meanwhile, Dot observes that Olivia, an unfulfilled interior designer who was close friends with Dot's mother, is an alcoholic with a prescription drug addiction. Late one night, while returning to her bedroom, Dot observes Paul raping Nina in her bedroom. It becomes clear that Paul has been sexually abusing his daughter for years.

At school, Dot is a social outcast, though Connor, a basketball player, takes an interest in her, much to the chagrin of Nina's abrasive friend, Michelle, who is pursuing him. One afternoon, Nina returns home early from cheerleading practice and overhears Dot playing Beethoven on the family's piano. When one of the strings breaks, Nina hears Dot swear loudly, before vocally harmonizing with the strings as she tunes them. Realizing Dot is neither deaf nor mute, Nina withholds her knowledge of this. At lunch the next day, acting under the guise that Dot cannot hear, Nina assays her by confessing her hatred of her father, and details her plan to murder him.

That evening, Dot goes on a date with Connor, who is able to communicate with her by lip reading. Dot returns home to find Paul and Nina in bed together, and deliberately breaks a vase in the hallway, interrupting; Nina realizes the action signifies Dot's alliance with her. Later, Dot comforts Nina in her bedroom as she cries herself to sleep. The following night, after a basketball game, Connor confides numerous personal secrets to Dot, including his attention deficit disorder and his chronic masturbation. The two proceed to have sex in the school swimming pool. Meanwhile, Nina returns home from the game and is visited by Paul in her bedroom while she irons her cheerleading uniform. Mustering the courage to proceed with the murder, Nina tells him to close his eyes, and that she has a secret to show him; she proceeds to approach him with the hot iron to burn his face, but is interrupted when Dot returns home. Nina puts the iron down, and instead lies to her father that she is pregnant with his child and needs a thousand dollars for an abortion. He agrees to give Nina the money the next day.

Nina and Dot prepare to attend the school's spring dance the following night. While getting ready, Nina tells Dot she is going to kill Paul that night and run away with the abortion money he is giving her. She explains that she will find work as a stripper, believing she can become famous "like Courtney Love." Before the girls depart for the dance, Paul confronts Nina after finding tampons in her purse, and accuses her of lying about the pregnancy. Meanwhile, Dot, who is playing "Moonlight Sonata" downstairs, hears the argument. The confrontation becomes violent, and eventually descends into a rape before Dot comes to Nina's defense, strangling Paul to death with a piano wire. Olivia, in a drug-induced stupor, stumbles upon the scene, unfazed by her husband's corpse, but amazed by the revelation that Dot can hear.

Michelle arrives at the house to pick Nina and Dot up. The two quickly change their dresses, which are soaked in blood, and leave. At the dance, Dot reveals to Connor that she can hear and speak; angered by her deception, he storms away. Nina and Dot leave the dance, and walk to a riverbank in the woods, where they bury a backpack containing their blood-soaked clothing. Nina asks Dot why she pretended to be deaf-mute. Dot explains that, after her mother died during her childhood, she stopped speaking and began communicating only with sign language, as it made her feel closer to her father. When the girls return home, they find police cars at the house, and Olivia turning herself in for Paul's murder. Olivia apologizes to her daughter, and atones for having allowed Paul's sexual abuse of Nina go ignored. The following morning, Nina and Dot sit together and play piano, freed from their respective fathers.

== Cast ==
- Elisha Cuthbert as Nina Deer
- Camilla Belle as Dot
- Martin Donovan as Paul Deer
- Edie Falco as Olivia Deer
- Shawn Ashmore as Connor Kennedy
- Katy Mixon as Michelle Fell
- David Gallagher as Brian
- Shannon Marie Woodward as Fiona
- Maria Cash as Janice Feltswatter
- Steve Uzzell as Mr. Piln
- Jo Baker as Myrna
- Ken Thomas as Officer Jim

== Production ==
=== Casting ===
After appearing in The Girl Next Door, Cuthbert wanted to "not just ... play the hot girl in the movie, it kills me." She had just finished the House of Wax and "was ready to do something that was definitely more character-driven." She read the Sundance workshop script by writers Abdi Nazemian and Micah Shraft, who had not previously made a feature film, and became an associate producer for the film, originally to be titled Dot.

Cuthbert had initially wanted to play the role of the silent Dot, but director Jamie Babbit instead cast Belle in that part after Thora Birch dropped out of the project. Babbit reasoned that "To me, Dot has to be someone you could believe would be invisible in high school. You look at Elisha, this beautiful woman with the most perfect body you've ever seen and you think, there's no high school in America where this girl could be invisible. No matter how much hair and makeup I do, it's not going to happen." Cuthbert ultimately agreed to take the role, though she initially found it difficult to connect with: "I had a healthy childhood. That was a conflict for me because I had nothing to draw on for this character. Everything about this character made no sense in some ways. Everything about me wanted to defend myself and stand up for myself, but I couldn't do that for the character because this is all she knows. It was challenging."

Belle's role as Dot was a departure from previous roles and the film was released around the same time as two other indie films starring Belle, The Ballad of Jack and Rose and The Chumscrubber. Belle learned sign language and classical piano for the role, and wore no makeup for the part. She said of her part that "It was a lonely time 'cause she is a very lonely, depressing character." Cuthbert said that acting her part was complicated by Belle "not doing a whole lot in the movie, as far as dialogue goes – it was difficult, because we had to find the right timing and the beats."

The actors were brought together before filming commenced to go through ideas relating to the film, in order that they were familiar with the long-term situation of the characters. Cuthbert spoke to psychiatrists about sexual abuse, and the cast read articles about women who had been sexually abused.

=== Filming ===
The film was shot during September and October 2004 in Austin, Texas, and was produced by the University of Texas' Burnt Orange productions as their first feature. It was made for approximately $1 million, funded by the University of Texas Film Institute. Although the film is set in suburban Connecticut, Bowie High School in Austin was the principal filming location. A total of 36 University of Texas students worked on the film.

The film was shot in high-definition video. Variety said that "[director of photography] M. David Mullen's high-definition, widescreen camerawork supplies a lucid, moody look, matched by Jeff Rona's brooding score." MSNBC's Christy Lemire noted that "Every frame of The Quiet, with its overly styled blue-gray tint and hazy interiors, calls to mind 9½ Weeks, Fatal Attraction or Unfaithful." Metroactive saw that "the purplish blues (the color that seems to work best in HD) are deeply saturated for such a cost-effective medium, and the color is never milky or streaky. At times, Mullen and Babbit overdo the murk." IndieWire agreed, noting that the "use of smoke to mask the use of high-def video ... results in laughably inexplicable smoky interiors lit like a high school production of Les Miserables." SF Station's Mel Valentin argued that Babbit effectively exaggerated the limitations of the budget and using HD video: "the video artifacts, lighting, night-time shooting, and sparse sets end up creating an oneiric, fairy-tale quality that helps to balances out the undercurrent of violence that permeates the characters’ actions."

The scene where Nina's father Paul attacks her was notably difficult to film, because Cuthbert was genuinely hurt by Donovan, who was "very method" during filming, and Babbit was caught between wanting to protect her and the need for Cuthbert "to go to a scary place." Cuthbert said that playing a victim was hard for her, and that "there were moments when I would go to the bathroom and bawl."

== Release ==
Following its premiere at the Toronto International Film Festival in September 2005, the film initially failed to find a distributor. It was released in cinemas by Sony Pictures Classics, first opening in seven theaters in New York City and Los Angeles on August 25, 2006.

=== Home media ===
The film was released on DVD on February 13, 2007, with special features including “Fetal Pig, Fetal Pig, Let Me In”, a featurette on the dissection scene, “On Location: Shooting in Austin”, “Sans Celluloid: The Quiet and the Digital Camera", a script development featurette, and cast selection.

== Reception ==
=== Box office ===
During its opening week of limited release in New York City and Los Angeles, the film earned $27,546. The film expanded to 300 screens across the United States on September 1, 2006, ultimately appearing on a total of 366 screens. The film remained in release for 18 weeks, and grossed a total of $381,420 in the United States.

=== Critical response ===
The film was poorly received by critics. On the review aggregator website Rotten Tomatoes, 22% of 96 critics' reviews are positive. The website's consensus reads: "This psychological thriller's talented cast is undercut by leaden pacing and a problematic plot." Metacritic, which uses a weighted average, assigned the film a score of 29 out of 100, based on 24 critics, indicating "generally unfavorable" reviews.

A number of critics noted that the film exemplified camp, including Jeff Shannon of The Seattle Times who noted it "bordered" on it, and was "loaded with lesbian undertones... this wretched drama plays like a high-school horror flick that trades monsters and mayhem for an overdose of force-fed cruelty." Bruce Kirkland of Canoe concurred: "If the subject matter was not so damn depressing, this dialogue would be camp-style laughable." Manohla Dargis of The New York Times similarly noted that the film lacked the "go-for-broke lunacy that makes a flick like Wild Things a classic of its trashy kind and might have saved this film."

In contrast, MTV called it "a powerful tale of seclusion, sexual abuse and sisterhood." The Monitor believed that "underappreciated at the box office, this film is, excuse the pun, quietly powerful." Patrick Luce of Monsters & Critics called it "a slow-burn thriller that keeps the audience hooked ... thanks to a disturbing plot and solid performances from its cast." Shawn Levy of The Oregonian also gave a favorable review, awarding it a B-rating and writing that "Babbit, with unnervingly beautiful compositions and sharp editing, lures you so skillfully into the film's awful revelations and sickening atmosphere, you feel rather like Dot: defenseless, alone, vulnerable."

Tonal inconsistency was a point of contention among critics, including David Rooney of Variety, who found that the film "seems unsure whether to push for suburban-Gothic psychosexual excess or tongue-in-cheek malevolence... the film is derailed by its own silliness." Christy Lemire of MSNBC complained that "Not a single moment feels believable in the film, which is trying very hard to be a sexy, intense psychological thriller but instead just feels lurid and exploitative." Owen Gleiberman of Entertainment Weekly deemed the film "dank and rhythmless," while Andrew O'Hehir of Salon wrote that it is "a terrible example of what can happen when the wrong sets of talented people get together. It isn't convincing as talky psychological realism or as high-school satire or as ghoulish forbidden melodrama, although Belle and Cuthbert have their best and creepiest moments in that mode." Alternately, James Berardinelli of Reel Views praised the film for its depiction of familial sexual abuse victims, writing: "One strength of The Quiet is that it does not deal exploitatively with the incest/sexual abuse issue in its quest to generate tension. This is a grim subject, and Babbit gives it its due. Nina is obviously confused and damaged."

The writing of the film's characters was a point of contention, with Metroactive noting that "The role [of Olivia, Nina's mother] is savagely underwritten, leaving [Edie] Falco dangling, motiveless, for much of the movie"; Monsters & Critics also felt that "at times her character seems like more of an after thought than having any real purpose." IndieWire also felt that the characters of Dot and Nina were underwritten, and Empire Movies similarly decried the "blatant under-use of two talented young actresses." The Houston Chronicle's Bruce Westbrook criticized the film for "utterly failing its characters." Jeff Vice of the Deseret News noted that the film had "an awful script that features some howlingly bad dialogue."

Assessment of the acting of Cuthbert and Belle was often positive: Mark Olsen of the Los Angeles Times, though dismissive of the film overall, wrote that "Both Cuthbert and Belle are nimble, surprising actresses, and they manage to navigate the film’s increasingly ridiculous twists with their dignity intact." Gazelle Emami of The Daily Californian similarly conceded that, "Despite the plot's failings, Cuthbert does a convincing job in her role, exuding an outer shell so tough that when her inner, softer layers emerge, it's a natural change of character." Empire Movies agreed, commenting that "this is Elisha Cuthbert's best film performance to date. Cuthbert's Nina has the majority of the most graphic and disturbing dialogue in the film, especially during one particular lunchroom scene where the camera is close up on Cuthbert and Belle's faces." Metroactive also noted that "Belle nearly carries The Quiet in her close-ups." Mel Valentin of SF Station agreed that "performance wise, The Quiet belongs to Camilla Belle and Elisha Cuthbert," noting that "Belle ... has to act through body language and facial expressions [and] mostly carries it off, but even a talented actress can only do so much with such a passive role ... Cuthbert acquits herself well in the more active, substantive role (again, for the most part), but her performance is undermined by the questionable decision to put her character in skimpy clothing." However, Ruthe Stein of the San Francisco Chronicle dissented, arguing that "Cuthbert flounces around a lot but doesn't have the range to express Nina's feelings." Wesley Morris of The Boston Globe said of Belle that "on screen she's hollow. The film is already visually dead, and it dies a little more whenever she's alone in a scene, which is often."

=== Themes and analysis ===
Some critics recognized lesbian undertones to the relationship between Nina and Dot.

Upon its original release, critic Andrew O'Hehir of Salon noted that The Quiet "wobbles between genres." In his 2017 book Twenty First Century Horror Films, film scholar Douglas Keesey classifies The Quiet as a horror film, writing that Dot represents "the gothic heroine haunted by her past," while Nina embodies "the girl in a horror movie whose fear of a monster invading her bedroom comes true." Alexandra Heller-Nicholas of Vulture also considers it a horror film that exemplifies a "gothic incest nightmare... Vicious, tragic, and heartbreaking, The Quiet is contemporary suburban gothic at its bleakest." Director Jamie Babbit commented in 2006 that she had largely been drawn to the screenplay because it exemplified the "suburban horror genre."

== See also ==
- List of films featuring the deaf and hard of hearing

== Sources ==
- Keesey, Douglas (2017). Twenty First Century Horror Films. Harpenden, England: Kamera Books. ISBN 978-1-843-44906-5.
