= 28th Golden Raspberry Awards =

Award ceremony presented by the Golden Raspberry Award Foundation in 2007

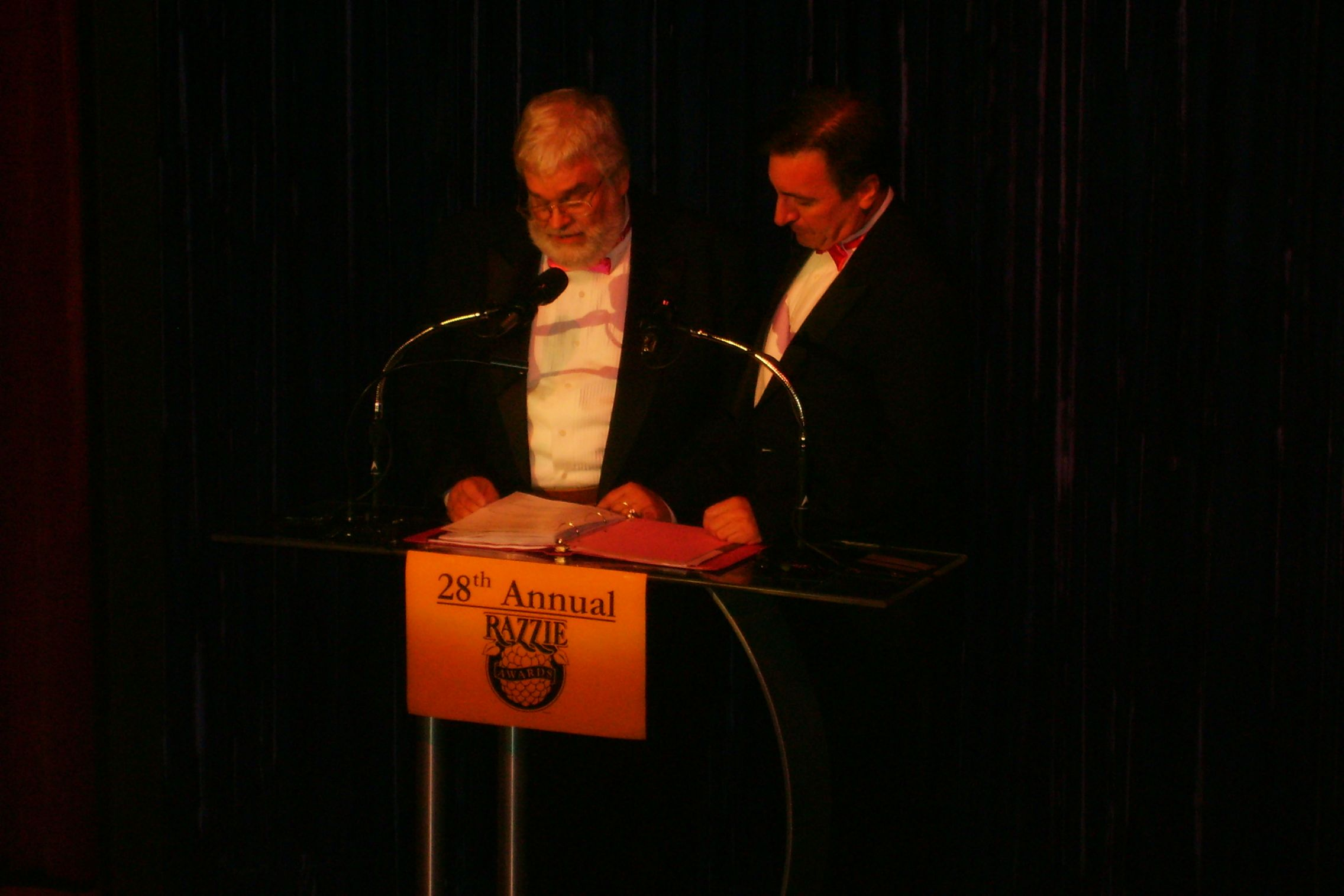
- 28th Golden Raspberry Awards Presentation
- Date: February 23, 2008
- Site: Santa Monica, California

Highlights
- Worst Picture: I Know Who Killed Me
- Most awards: I Know Who Killed Me (7)
- Most nominations: I Know Who Killed Me / I Now Pronounce You Chuck & Larry / Norbit (8)

The 28th Golden Raspberry Awards, or Razzies, were held on February 23, 2008, in Santa Monica, California to honor the worst films the film industry had to offer in 2007. The nominations were announced on January 21. In line with Razzies tradition, both the nominee announcements and ceremony preceded the corresponding Academy Awards functions by one day.

The most nominated films of 2007 were I Know Who Killed Me, I Now Pronounce You Chuck & Larry and Norbit with eight nominations each. I Know Who Killed Me was the big winner of the evening, receiving seven awards. Eddie Murphy received a Razzie record five personal nominations, all surrounding his work (especially his performance of multiple characters) in Norbit. He ended up winning three awards, one for each character he portrayed. Actress Lindsay Lohan also won two awards for her dual roles in I Know Who Killed Me. The special category introduced this year was Worst Excuse for a Horror Movie.

== Winners and nominees ==
Winner (in bold)

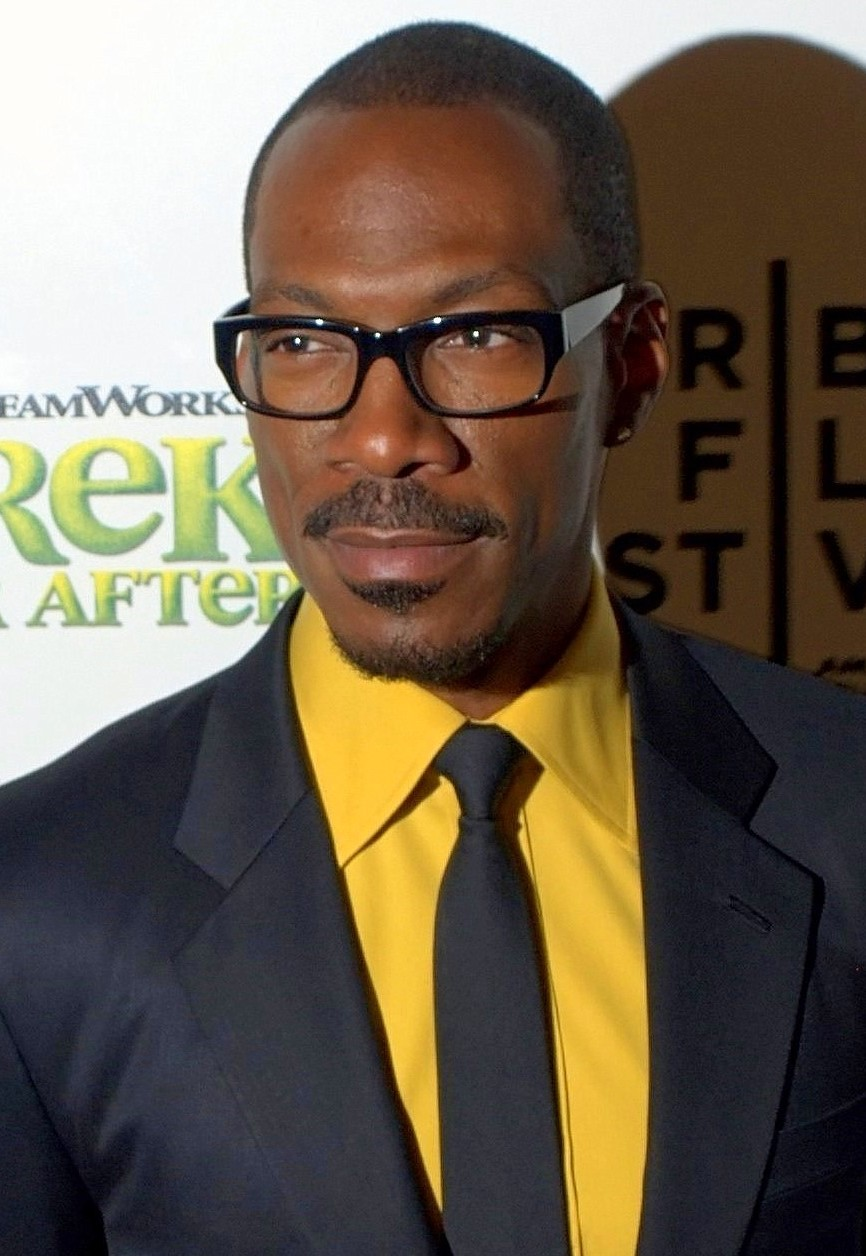
Eddie Murphy, Worst Actor, Worst Supporting Actor, and Worst Supporting Actress winner

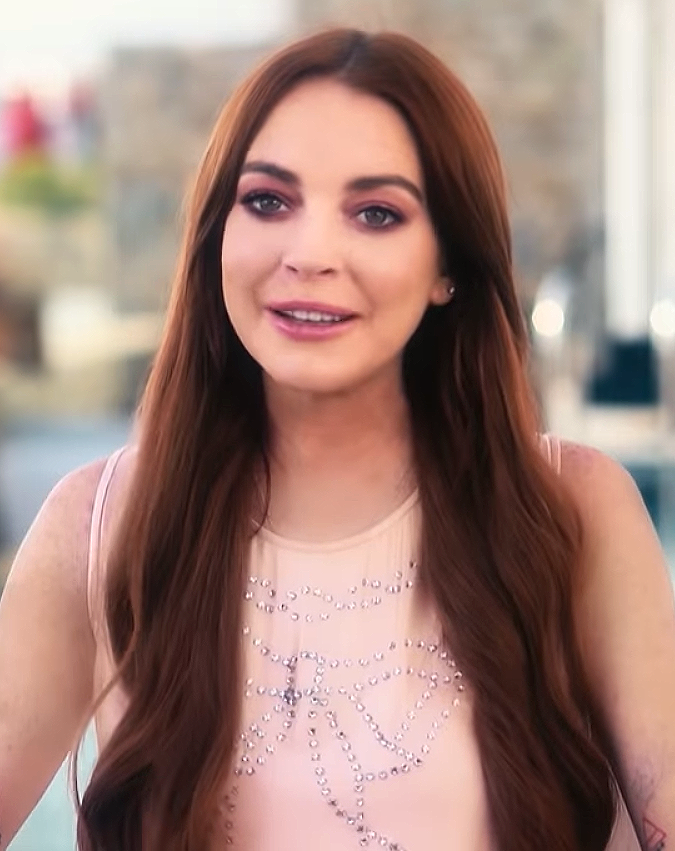
Lindsay Lohan, Worst Actress and Worst Screen Couple winner

Category	Recipient
Worst Picture	**I Know Who Killed Me (Sony/TriStar)**
Worst Picture	Bratz (Lionsgate)
Worst Picture	Daddy Day Camp (Sony/TriStar)
Worst Picture	I Now Pronounce You Chuck & Larry (Universal)
Worst Picture	Norbit (DreamWorks)
Worst Actor	**Eddie Murphy in Norbit (as the character of Norbit)**
Worst Actor	Nicolas Cage in Ghost Rider, National Treasure: Book of Secrets and Next as Johnny Blaze/Ghost Rider, Benjamin Franklin Gates and Cris Johnson (respectively)
Worst Actor	Jim Carrey in The Number 23 as Walter Sparrow
Worst Actor	Cuba Gooding Jr. in Daddy Day Camp and Norbit as Charlie Hinton and Deion Hughes (respectively)
Worst Actor	Adam Sandler in I Now Pronounce You Chuck & Larry as Chuck Levine
Worst Actress	**Lindsay Lohan and Lindsay Lohan in I Know Who Killed Me (as the characters of Aubrey Fleming and Dakota Moss)**
Worst Actress	Jessica Alba in Awake, Fantastic Four: Rise of the Silver Surfer and Good Luck Chuck as Sam Lockwood, Sue Storm/Invisible Woman and Cam Wexler (respectively)
Worst Actress	Logan Browning, Janel Parrish, Nathalia Ramos and Skyler Shaye in Bratz as Sasha, Jade, Yasmin and Cloe (respectively)
Worst Actress	Elisha Cuthbert in Captivity as Jennifer Tree
Worst Actress	Diane Keaton in Because I Said So as Daphne Wilder
Worst Supporting Actor	**Eddie Murphy in Norbit (as the character of Mr. Wong)**
Worst Supporting Actor	Orlando Bloom in Pirates of the Caribbean: At World's End as Will Turner
Worst Supporting Actor	Kevin James in I Now Pronounce You Chuck & Larry as Larry Valentine
Worst Supporting Actor	Rob Schneider in I Now Pronounce You Chuck & Larry as Asian Minister
Worst Supporting Actor	Jon Voight in Bratz, National Treasure: Book of Secrets, September Dawn and Transformers as Principal Dimly, Patrick Henry Gates, Jacob Samuelson and John Keller (respectively)
Worst Supporting Actress	**Eddie Murphy in Norbit (as the character of Rasputia)**
Worst Supporting Actress	Jessica Biel in I Now Pronounce You Chuck & Larry and Next as Alex McDonough and Liz Cooper (respectively)
Worst Supporting Actress	Carmen Electra in Epic Movie as Mystique
Worst Supporting Actress	Julia Ormond in I Know Who Killed Me as Susan Fleming
Worst Supporting Actress	Nicollette Sheridan in Code Name: The Cleaner as Diane
Worst Screen Couple	**Lindsay Lohan and Lindsay Lohan ("as the yang to her own yin") in I Know Who Killed Me**
Worst Screen Couple	Jessica Alba and either Hayden Christensen in Awake, Dane Cook in Good Luck Chuck or Ioan Gruffudd in Fantastic Four: Rise of the Silver Surfer
Worst Screen Couple	"Any combination of two totally airheaded characters" in Bratz
Worst Screen Couple	Eddie Murphy (as Norbit) and either Eddie Murphy (as Mr. Wong) or Eddie Murphy (as Rasputia) in Norbit
Worst Screen Couple	Adam Sandler and either Kevin James or Jessica Biel in I Now Pronounce You Chuck & Larry
Worst Remake or Rip-off	**I Know Who Killed Me (TriStar) (rip-off of Hostel, Saw and The Patty Duke Show)**
Worst Remake or Rip-off	Are We Done Yet? (Sony/Columbia/Revolution) (remake of Mr. Blandings Builds His Dream House)
Worst Remake or Rip-off	Bratz (Lionsgate) (a rip-off if ever there was one!)
Worst Remake or Rip-off	Epic Movie (Fox) ("rip-off of every movie it rips off")
Worst Remake or Rip-off	Who's Your Caddy? (MGM/Dimension) (rip-off of Caddyshack)
Worst Prequel or Sequel	**Daddy Day Camp (TriStar)**
Worst Prequel or Sequel	Aliens vs. Predator: Requiem (Fox)
Worst Prequel or Sequel	Evan Almighty (Universal)
Worst Prequel or Sequel	Hannibal Rising (MGM)
Worst Prequel or Sequel	Hostel: Part II (Lionsgate)
Worst Director	**Chris Sivertson for I Know Who Killed Me**
Worst Director	Dennis Dugan for I Now Pronounce You Chuck & Larry
Worst Director	Roland Joffé for Captivity
Worst Director	Brian Robbins for Norbit
Worst Director	Fred Savage for Daddy Day Camp
Worst Screenplay	**I Know Who Killed Me (written by Jeffrey Hammond)**
Worst Screenplay	Daddy Day Camp (screenplay by Geoff Rodkey, J. David Stem & David N. Weiss)
Worst Screenplay	Epic Movie (written by Jason Friedberg & Aaron Seltzer)
Worst Screenplay	I Now Pronounce You Chuck & Larry (screenplay by Barry Fanaro, Alexander Payne & Jim Taylor)
Worst Screenplay	Norbit (screenplay by Eddie Murphy, Charlie Murphy, Jay Scherick & David Ronn)
Worst Excuse for a Horror Movie	**I Know Who Killed Me (Sony/TriStar)**
Worst Excuse for a Horror Movie	Aliens vs. Predator: Requiem (Fox)
Worst Excuse for a Horror Movie	Captivity (Lionsgate)
Worst Excuse for a Horror Movie	Hannibal Rising (MGM)
Worst Excuse for a Horror Movie	Hostel: Part II (Lionsgate)

== Films with multiple nominations ==
The following films received multiple nominations:

Nominations	Films
8	I Know Who Killed Me
8	I Now Pronounce You Chuck & Larry
8	Norbit
5	Bratz
5	Daddy Day Camp
3	Captivity
3	Epic Movie
2	Aliens vs. Predator: Requiem
2	Awake
2	Fantastic Four: Rise of the Silver Surfer
2	Good Luck Chuck
2	Hannibal Rising
2	Hostel: Part II
2	National Treasure: Book of Secrets
2	Next

== See also ==
- 2007 in film
- 80th Academy Awards
- 61st British Academy Film Awards
- 65th Golden Globe Awards
- 14th Screen Actors Guild Awards
