= List of Popular Mechanics for Kids episodes =

A list of episodes from the series Popular Mechanics for Kids.

== Series overview ==
Season	Episodes	Originally aired (Canadian air dates)	
Season	Episodes	Season premiere	Season finale
1	22	September 7, 1997	February 8, 1998
2	22	September 6, 1998	January 31, 1999
3	22	September 5, 1999	January 30, 2000
4	6	September 3, 2000	October 8, 2000

== Episodes ==
=== Season 1 (1997–1998) ===
No. in series	Title	Episode summary	Original air date
1	"Underground"	Sewers and tunnels; subway trains; underground escape tunnel; Channel tunnel.	September 7, 1997
2	"Submarines"	Coral reefs; nuclear sub; the Titanic.	September 14, 1997
3	"Special Effects"	Special effects; movie makeup; illusions; robots; fake blood.	September 21, 1997
4	"Zoos"	Learning how zoos and biodome environments are as close to animal natural habitats as possible.	September 28, 1997
5	"Cool Cars"	Stereo lithography and car design; gasoline engines; alternative fuels; race cars; monster trucks.	October 5, 1997
6	"Coasters"	How roller coasters work; weightlessness.	October 12, 1997
7	"Sports"	Basketball; ball bearings; bike of the future; curve balls; golf balls; skating; lifts; ramps.	October 19, 1997
8	"Garbage"	Garbage trucks; solid waste disposal; garbage archaeologist.	October 26, 1997
9	"Boats"	Powerboats; tugboat; ocean research vessel; tall ships; Coast Guard cutter; high-tech navigation.	November 3, 1997
10	"Buildings"	Building skyscrapers; demolition; fear of heights; elevators; concrete.	November 10, 1997
11	"Aircraft Carriers"	Aircraft-carrier landing; G-force suits and survival equipment; navigation.	November 17, 1997
12	"Electricity"	Electricity: lightning; power-line maintenance; resuscitation.	November 24, 1997
13	"Food Production"	Visits to an ice-cream store and a potato-chip factory; how bacteria spreads.	December 1, 1997
14	"Emergency"	Firefighters and emergency services; forest fires; firefighter training; an airport crash-crew.	December 18, 1997
15	"Aquariums"	Aquariums; training sea-mammals; Monterey Bay Aquarium; fishing for specimens.	December 15, 1997
16	"Toys and Games"	LEGO factory; classic toys; video games.	December 22, 1997
17	"Spaceships"	Johnson Space Center in Houston; space suits; flight simulation.	December 29, 1997
18	"Robots"	Robotic technology; artificial limbs; personality simulation; sensory reactions; "Robocop."	January 5, 1998
19	"Our Greatest Hits"	A collaboration of clips from the most exciting, fascinating, and educational episodes.	January 12, 1998
20	"Money"	The stock market; the Royal Canadian Mint; collectors coins.	January 19, 1998
21	"Air Transportation"	Air-crash survival; a hot-air balloon; a jet-engine factory.	January 26, 1998
22	"Music Production"	Recording studio; sound-mixing; rock band.	February 2, 1998

=== Season 2 (1998–1999) ===
No. in series	Title	Episode summary	Original air date
23	"Fly At Your Own Risk"	Elisha flies in a vertical wind tunnel; pedal plane; wing-walker.	September 6, 1998
24	"North Pole"	Inuit of the Arctic Circle; dog sled; building an igloo; traditional feast.	September 13, 1998
25	"Whodunnit!?"	Tyler and Elisha help detectives investigate a break-in; surveillance gadgets; polygraph.	September 20, 1998
26	"Gross Out"	Tyler and Elisha visit a recycling plant; digestive system; manure.	September 27, 1998
27	"Ocean Adventures"	Diving with sharks; whale blubber; bottled water from icebergs.	October 4, 1998
28	"Police Force"	Police training; LAPD high-speed pursuit; handling handguns.	October 11, 1998
29	"Sports: Riding, Gliding and Sliding"	Snowboarding with the Canadian Olympic team; NHL goalie for a day; surfing.	October 18, 1998
30	"FX!"	Special effects; blue-screen studio; sound tracks; Kung Fu battle.	October 25, 1998
31	"Earth Power"	Molten lava; Universal Studios Twister ride; setting off an avalanche.	November 1, 1998
32	"Talk To the Animals"	Communicating with dolphins; animal actors; training birds of prey to clear airport runways.	November 8, 1998
33	"After Dark"	Night owls; bat cave; nightmare lab; neon signs.	November 15, 1998
34	"Emergency Rescues!"	Rescue dog searches for an avalanche victim; hostage situation; lifeguards.	November 22, 1998
35	"Under the Big Top"	Circus school; acrobatics; Cirque du Soleil; trapeze artist; clowning.	November 29, 1998
36	"Zero Gravity"	Free-falling bodies; heavenly bodies; Keck Observatory; rocket ride; astronaut training.	December 6, 1998
37	"Swamps and Gators"	Secrets of the wetlands; nutria; Everglades safari; Florida's Gatorland.	December 13, 1998
38	"Mega Trucks"	Big rigs; cleaning trucks; mining trucks; bicycle gears.	December 20, 1998
39	"Boom!"	Detonators and dynamite; pyrotechnics; rock-blasting at a quarry; special-effects explosion.	December 27, 1998
40	"The Fastest..."	Jet-powered truck; Olympian Donovan Bailey.	January 3, 1999
41	"Our Greatest Hits II"	A collection of Tyler and Elisha's best and most exciting adventures from Season 2 of Popular Mechanics for Kids.	January 10, 1999
42	"Creepy Crawlers"	Insects; leech farm; honeybees; exterminator.	January 17, 1999
43	"Monster Trucks"	Megasaurus eats cars for lunch.	January 24, 1999
44	"How Do They Do That?"	How to get an egg into a bottle; various other adventures requested by the audience.	January 31, 1999

=== Season 3 (1999–2000) ===
No. in series	Title	Episode summary	Original air date
45	"Cool Schools"	Underwater acting school; school for bodyguards; Hummer land vehicle.	September 5, 1999
46	"Ticket To Ride"	Universal Studios Islands of Adventure; water rides; roller coasters; dinosaurs.	September 12, 1999
47	"Sea Creatures"	Dolphins; turtles; manatees; humpback whales.	September 19, 1999
48	"Dirty Work"	In New York City; city garbage dump; rhinos in a zoo; fish-gutting factory.	September 26, 1999
49	"Slimy and Slithery"	Octopus; frozen frog; worm farm.	October 3, 1999
50	"Body Mechanics"	Break dancing; orthopedic surgeon; witnessing an operation; triathletes.	October 10, 1999
51	"Spook Out"	USS Hornet; venom from a tarantula; Thrillvania theme park.	October 17, 1999
52	"Super Bikes"	Motorcycle daredevils; Tyler takes the new slide machine for a drive.	October 24, 1999
53	"Freaky Flying"	Behind the wheel of a blimp; para-gliding; military spy plane.	October 31, 1999
54	"Our Greatest Hits III"	Some of the most awesome adventures returns in this special episode.	November 7, 1999
55	"Pirates and Gold"	Elisha strikes gold; Tyler examines the goo on cave walls; mysteries of the ocean.	November 14, 1999
56	"Ice"	Snow scenes in movies; preparing a hockey rink; driving a Zamboni machine; NASA's ice tunnel.	November 21, 1999
57	"Fun In the Desert"	Tyler learns how to ride a sand board and race a vehicle across dry sand.	November 28, 1999
58	"Life Savers"	Elisha visits a family of crash test dummies and an armored car factory.	December 5, 1999
59	"Down Below"	Searching the ocean floor; ancient shipwreck; making false gold.	December 12, 1999
60	"Navy Seals"	Combat training; underwater explosives; parachute team.	December 19, 1999
61	"Killer Creatures"	Meeting the most dangerous animals on the planet including Komodo dragons and polar bears.	December 26, 1999
62	"Real Life Science Fiction"	Vanessa helps put together the comic book Spawn.	January 2, 2000
63	"Our Greatest Hits IV"	More of the best adventures.	January 9, 2000
64	"Space Station"	Defying gravity; NASA laboratory; how space stations are built.	January 16, 2000
65	"Water"	Behind Niagara Falls; emergency oil-spill team; indestructible-raft ride.	January 23, 2000
66	"Behind the Scenes"	Staging a rock concert; professional wrestling; Hockey; Cirque du Soleil.	January 30, 2000

=== Season 4 (2000) ===
No. in series	Title	Episode summary	Original air date
67	"Extreme Rides"	Powered parachute plane; street luge; kite skiing; build an extreme ride.	September 3, 2000
68	"Fighting Disaster"	Front-end loader; collapse rescue team; firefighting technology.	September 10, 2000
69	"Escape"	Escape artist Dean Gunnarson; underwater helicopter; life chute.	September 17, 2000
70	"Horseplay"	Strathcona Mounted Troop; jousting; ranch in Alberta.	September 24, 2000
71	"In Deep Water"	Underwater adventures; submarine canyon; underwater hotel; increasing one's buoyancy.	October 1, 2000
72	"On the Front Lines"	Canadian parachute team the Skyhawks; Army surveillance truck; messenger kite.	October 8, 2000
