= I Know Who Killed Me =

2007 American psychological thriller film

- Theatrical release poster
- Directed by: Chris Sivertson
- Written by: Jeff Hammond
- Produced by: Frank Mancuso Jr. David Grace
- Starring: Lindsay Lohan; Julia Ormond; Neal McDonough; Brian Geraghty
- Cinematography: John R. Leonetti
- Edited by: Lawrence Jordan
- Music by: Joel McNeely
- Production companies: TriStar Pictures; 360 Pictures
- Distributed by: Sony Pictures Releasing (North America); Summit Entertainment (International)
- Release date: July 27, 2007
- Running time: 106 minutes
- Country: United States
- Language: English
- Box office: $9.7 million

I Know Who Killed Me is a 2007 American psychological thriller film directed by Chris Sivertson from a screenplay by Jeff Hammond. It stars Lindsay Lohan as a young woman who is abducted and tortured by a sadistic serial killer. After surviving the abduction, she insists that her identity is that of another woman. Julia Ormond, Neal McDonough, Brian Geraghty, Garcelle Beauvais, Spencer Garrett and Bonnie Aarons appear in supporting roles.

The film received intense negative media coverage during production and upon its release, as Lohan publicly struggled with addiction and other personal issues. Filming took place mostly in California, from December 2006 to March 2007. It was theatrically released in the United States by TriStar Pictures on July 27, 2007. It was promptly deemed a failure and called one of the worst films ever made, being the most awarded at the 28th Golden Raspberry Awards, winning seven of eight nominations. The film did, however, attain a more successful home video performance, having almost quadrupled its U.S. box office gross in estimated domestic DVD sales.

I Know Who Killed Me subsequently developed a cult following that has reexamined it as a modern giallo and several screenings of it have been put together by historic theaters and film festivals.

== Plot ==
The quiet suburb of New Salem is being terrorized by a serial killer who abducts and tortures young women, holding them captive for weeks before murdering them. Aubrey Fleming, a pianist and aspiring writer, appears to be his latest victim when she disappears during a night out with her friends. She is later seen bound and gagged on an operating table as her hands are exposed to dry ice. As the days tick by, the special FBI Task Force convened to track the killer begins to lose hope of finding her before it's too late.

Late one night, a driver discovers a young woman by the side of a deserted road, disheveled and seriously wounded, with one of her hands and legs amputated. The girl, who looks identical to Aubrey, is rushed to the hospital, where Aubrey's distraught parents, Susan and Daniel, wait by her side as she slips in and out of consciousness. When she is finally able to speak, she shocks everyone by claiming to be a down-on-her-luck stripper named Dakota Moss. Convinced Aubrey is suffering from post-traumatic stress disorder, her doctors, parents, and law enforcement officials can only wait for rest and therapy to restore her memory. But after returning to her parents' suburban home, she continues to insist she is not who they think she is.

An FBI psychologist believes Dakota to be a delusional persona of Aubrey, and the agents speculate that the persona functions to distance and protect Aubrey from the events that happened. Examining Aubrey's laptop, they discover a short story about a girl with an identical twin sister named Dakota. In addition, a DNA test confirms that Dakota is Aubrey. Nonetheless, Dakota explains away her injuries to the police, recollecting a series of bizarre events that happened before she arrived in town. She begins to suspect she may be Aubrey's identical twin sister and comes to believe her injuries are sympathetic resonance with her twin's wounds, manifesting in a stigmata-like fashion. However, Susan shows Dakota a video of her pregnancy ultrasound clearly revealing there was only one fetus in her womb. Dakota confronts Daniel, who eventually admits that his and Susan's child died shortly after birth and that he informally adopted Aubrey from Virginia Sue Moss (another character that appears in Aubrey's short story), a crack addict who bore twin daughters — one of whom was Dakota, who was left to be raised by her biological mother. Susan has remained unaware of this for all of Aubrey's life.

Confused and terrified, Dakota starts seeing visions of a menacing figure slowly butchering his captive. One of these visions leads her to a nearby cemetery. After investigating the grave of Aubrey's recently murdered friend, Jennifer Toland, Dakota finds a blue ribbon from a piano competition, with a message from Jennifer's (and Aubrey's) piano teacher, Douglas Norquist. She is followed by Daniel and declares, "I know who killed me."

The two go, without FBI backup, to Norquist's home to confront him. Daniel heads into the house alone, leaving a panicking Dakota in the car. Attempting to calm herself, Dakota calls out to her twin, Aubrey, who is buried, to keep breathing slowly, as their lives are linked together. Dakota enters the house, attacks Norquist in self-defense, and cuts off his hand. She finds Daniel on the verge of death, having been clearly overpowered by Norquist. Dakota is also overpowered and tied up. Confused, Norquist asks why she has returned and exclaims that he buried her (referencing an earlier vision Dakota had). Dakota frees herself, kills Norquist, and heads into the nearby woods, finding where he supposedly buried Aubrey alive. Using her prosthetic hand, she smashes the front of the glass coffin that Norquist buried Aubrey in, revealing her barely alive in a white dress. This seemingly verifies Dakota's version of events. Relieved to have found and rescued her long-lost twin, Dakota lies on the ground next to her.

== Cast ==
- Lindsay Lohan as Aubrey Fleming / Dakota Moss
- Julia Ormond as Susan Fleming
- Neal McDonough as Daniel Fleming
- Brian Geraghty as Jerrod Pointer
- Garcelle Beauvais as Agent Julie Bascome
- Spencer Garrett as Agent Phil Lazarus
- Gregory Itzin as Dr. Greg Jameson
- Jessica Lee Rose as Marcia
- Megan Henning as Anya
- Bonnie Aarons as Fat Teena
- Kenya Moore as Jazmin
- Rodney Rowland as Kenny Scalfe
- Eddie Steeples as Saeed the prosthetic tech
- Thomas Tofel as Douglas Norquist

== Production ==
Before filming, Lohan took pole-dancing lessons to prepare for her role as a stripper, stating: "I've been in pole dancing lessons, S Factor by Sheila Kelley, every day for four hours. I have bruises all over." Filming dates took place between December 2006 and March 2007. Principal photography was mostly held in California. In the first week of production, filming was halted after Lohan was hospitalized, her representative saying "she was overheated and dehydrated." Production stayed halted soon after as Lohan underwent appendix surgery.

Filming was soon then delayed even longer after the incision was infected and the filmmakers were waiting for a doctor's approval for Lohan to continue working. This all occurred around the same time Lohan admitted herself to the Wonderland Center rehabilitation facility for a 30-day stay. During the stay she continued shooting the film, returning to the facility at night. Sivertson claimed that production "never lost any shooting days because of rehab," with Lohan declaring she drew from what she was personally experiencing to tackle some of the film's darker themes. Because of all the media attention Lohan was receiving, she could not even walk to her trailer without the paparazzi photographing her. Sometimes they would even end up in the background of some shots of the film.

Sivertson talked about his experience directing the film saying, "I was happy as hell to get my hands on the script. It's exactly the kind of thing I'm into. Stylistically I guess you could say the influence is Hitchcock filtered through De Palma and Lynch. There were echoes of some of my favorite movies in the script - stuff like Vertigo, Dressed to Kill, Twin Peaks, Blue Velvet," continuing that he wanted the movie "to play both as a dark psychological thriller and as a surreal fairy tale. I went for a very bright poppy look with saturated colors, particularly blues and reds." He concluded, "Love it or hate it, it's stuff that I wanted to see on the big screen and now I can. That makes me happy."

Sivertson stated about casting Lohan: "We needed someone who could play complete opposites... but not in a clichéd way. The movie really rests on Lindsay's shoulders." Likewise, producer Mancuso Jr.'s only concern in casting Lohan was whether the actress, best known for roles in family comedies and teen flicks, could continue making the transition and play more adult-oriented characters, admitting, "It was a risk, but it didn't scare me because I felt like she wouldn't do this unless she was willing to go for it."

Before the release, Lohan admitted to being apprehensive about taking on the role and people's reception: "Yeah, it kind of fucked my head up a little bit, just because it was so intense. Chris Sivertson is a fucking genius. We made a deal that I will do any film he wants me to do." After they enjoyed working together on the film, Lohan and Sivertson were in talks to team up for another horror movie titled Hippy, which did not materialize. She continued, "I don't think there has been a role for an actress like this movie was for me in so long. At first I was like 'I can't do this, I'm getting my leg cut off. I don't want to look like that in scenes, I want to look decent!' But that was just me being young and stupid," expressing her motive behind doing the movie wanting people to finally see her as an actress again, "I just pray people won't rip me apart for it, and be negative." In July 2007, Lohan was arrested for driving under the influence, which prevented her from doing promotion for the film, including its premiere event and a scheduled appearance on The Tonight Show with Jay Leno.

=== Potential director's cut ===
In 2019, Sivertson revealed the existence of a three-and-a-half-hour-long director's cut, disclosing, "[...] To a lot of people it doesn't make sense. And there were a lot of plot scenes, especially a lot of investigative FBI stuff, that were just totally cut out of the movie. [...] I was more interested at the time with just the weirdness of it all."

== Release ==
=== Home media ===
The DVD and Blu-ray versions were released on November 27, 2007 by Sony Pictures Home Entertainment. The art cover of the DVD shows Lohan, in blue, pole-dancing, with the faces of her alter egos Aubrey Fleming and Dakota Moss on either side. Among the extras are alternate opening and ending scenes with the latter showing that the entire plot was actually written by the Aubrey character. Other extras include an extended version of Lohan's strip dance at the club and bloopers. By January, the DVD had grossed $11.99 million. The Region 2 DVD was released January 28, 2008, with different cover art showing a close-up of Lohan, in red, doing her pole-dance at the strip club. In the United States, the film has grossed over $28 million in estimated DVD sales. A Walmart exclusive Bonus Disc DVD was also included upon release, featuring two short documentaries with cast and crew interviews.

== Soundtrack ==
I Know Who Killed Me

Film score by Joel McNeely
- Released: July 31, 2007
- Recorded: 2007
- Genre: Film soundtrack
- Length: 1:35:09
- Label: Varèse Sarabande

Professional ratings
Review scores
Source	Rating
AllMusic	3.5/5 stars

The score for I Know Who Killed Me, composed by Joel McNeely, was released on July 24, 2007. It drew comparisons to the television mystery scores by Billy Goldenberg and received almost unanimously positive reviews from film music critics, with James Southall of Movie Wave saying the "unexpectedly classy score seems to go beyond the call of duty" and Clark Douglas of Movie Music UK rating it 5 stars and calling it "one of the year's best scores, a must-have for those who are willing to take a trip into a deep, dark, and sometimes terrifying musical world."

1. "Prelude for a Madman"
2. "Duality"
3. "Fairytale Theme"
4. "A Daughter Is Dead"
5. "End of Innocence/Aubrey Is Gone"
6. "A Mother's Grief"
7. "Search for Aubrey"
8. "The Bus Stop"
9. "Spontaneous Bleed"
10. "Going Home"
11. "Jennifer's Room"
12. "Some People Get Cut"
13. "Investigating Stigmata"
14. "The Mirror"
15. "The Graveyard"
16. "I Know Who Killed Me"
17. "The House"
18. "Dad Dies"
19. "Death of Norquist"
20. "Prelude/Reunited"
21. "Valse Brillante, Op. 34, No. 2 in A Minor"

== Reception ==
=== Box office ===
The film premiered on July 27, 2007, to $3.5 million from 1,320 theaters, finishing ninth at the box office for that weekend but third among new releases, eventually grossing a total of $7.5 million by the end of its theatrical run in the United States. It ultimately grossed $9.7 million worldwide.

=== Critical reception ===
I Know Who Killed Me was not screened in advance for critics. On the review aggregator website Rotten Tomatoes, 9% of 77 critics' reviews are positive, with an average rating of 2.9/10. The website's consensus reads: "Distasteful and ludicrously plotted, I Know Who Killed Me is a career nadir for all involved – particularly Lindsay Lohan in a dual role." Metacritic, which uses a weighted average, assigned the film a score of 16 out of 100, based on 16 critics, indicating "overwhelming dislike". CinemaScore audience polling gave the film a rare average grade of "F".

Michael Rechtshaffen of The Hollywood Reporter said "There's a fresh candidate in the running for worst movie of 2007 honours. "I Know Who Killed Me", a ridiculous thriller (minus the thrills) starring the embattled Lindsay Lohan in a dual role, has all the hallmarks necessary for qualification: A nonsensical plot that grows sillier by the second, tawdry special effects, heavy-handed symbolism that's big on electric-blue hues and mechanical performances are all culprits as far as the title's concerned."

Empire Online named it number thirty-four in a fan-voted "50 Worst Movies List", saying "Remember how great Lindsay Lohan was in Mean Girls? Or Freaky Friday, or The Parent Trap? Well, if you do, be sure never to watch this, because it will spoil those memories forever. We could forgive Lohan for wanting to make a racier, adult thriller. If only it were thrilling." It was also on MRQE's 50 Worst Movies list.

The film did receive some positive reviews. Fangoria praised the film's imaginative use of color, saying "[T]he director and his visual team bathe the film in deep blues and reds, a welcome departure from the dirty green, sodium-lit palette of similarly themed horror fare, and the end result is simply a beautiful, eye-popping visual treat, so stylized that one can't help recalling Argento's approach to Suspiria." The Radio Times also alluded to the director "recalling the style of Dario Argento" in a "twisty, perversely fascinating psycho thriller."

The horror-movie website Bloody Disgusting gave the film a glowing review and suggested that, "Lohan's continual issues with drugs/alcohol/DUI’s/rehab/on-set bitchiness" were part of a "whirlwind of media frenzy" that was unnecessary and "irrelevant to the movie". The film itself was "a more-than-pleasant surprise, well-filmed, well-acted, especially by Lohan herself, and a surprisingly intriguing and gruesome little thriller." Boston Globe critic Ty Burr compared the film favorably to Brian de Palma's Sisters and Body Double, as well as the works of David Lynch.

=== Legacy ===
Years after its release, I Know Who Killed Me came to achieve cult status and was called a "midnight movie", as acknowledged by Sivertson during an interview in October 2019: "It definitely has. And the thing with that movie is it was so fast that I wasn't really conscious of any of that. We wrapped production in March, and then we were in theaters in July. [...] For a studio movie, that's super quick. My head was just so down buried in the thing. And yeah, I'm glad that it’s lived on in infamy or however people want to take it. If people are talking about it, I think that's good," and pondered about a possible director's cut release.

The film had frequently received screenings including at the Nuart Theatre, the Brattle Theatre, 92YTribeca, the 2013 San Luis Obispo International Film Festival, Alamo Drafthouse Cinemas and the Brooklyn Academy of Music, with the latter describing it as "deliriously, at times jaw-droppingly, perverse—exerting a strange fascination as a twisted mirror reflection of its troubled starlet's own downward spiral."

In March 2020, film critic William Bibbiani claimed: "I Know Who Killed Me is criminally misunderstood. It's not a classic, but it's an enjoyably strange giallo that doesn't deserve its terrible rep, and demands a serious reevaluation." Chicago's Music Box called it "an overlooked American giallo that earns the title in several ways" while Iowa City's FilmScene characterized it as "a stylish Argento-influenced giallo which was savaged by critics and misunderstood by audiences in its initial release." In January 2021, Charles Bramesco of The Guardian wrote that "this widely, wrongly maligned film has been embraced by a growing mini-cult attuned to its aesthetic of surreal artifice and grim interplay with real life." He continued, "the baggage [Lohan] dropped off at set only served to deepen and enrich the subtext of a stealth noir gem, one that gestures to a long-bygone era of movie stardom through the framework of a cheaper and dirtier sort of serial killer thriller," and that, "As a girl next door seemingly transformed overnight into a vamp with a cigarette-rasped voice and formidable pole-dancing prowess, she brings the thought experiment of “what if Barbara Stanwyck had been fed through Disney's wringer as a child?” to life in exhilarating fashion." While reexamining it for Splice Today, John Kidwell expressed that "on a metatextual level—specifically, as a film about the child star's painful transformation into sex symbol—I Know Who Killed Me is surprisingly self-aware and, at times, even intelligent."

In October 2021, Screen Slate announced they would be screening I Know Who Killed Me for its annual Scream Slate at the Roxy Cinema Tribeca and considered "modern audiences have also found it to be a genuinely thrilling example of a film that dares to be stylish, oblique, and extremely weird, like a sleazy update of Italian gialli plopped into the 2007 summer blockbuster season," adding that, "In further light of reevaluation of the way young women stars were mistreated and publicly vilified at the time, I Know Who Killed Me is a fascinating lens through which to revisit the 2000s." That same month, screenwriter Jeff Hammond was interviewed about the film's newfound popularity and legacy, analyzing, "Its contradictions exist on multiple levels and most of them were intentional. It has campy elements and it has serious elements," and praised Lohan's dual performance, "You can feel how different they are from each other [...] I think it's a great performance. She is a spectacularly gifted actor". Elaborating on the film's negative reception, he stated, "It seemed like the world had it in for her. It was ugly. Our movie was collateral damage. [...] Do you think we would have won all those Razzies with any other Aubrey/Dakota but her?" He concluded, "Even its harshest critics would have to admit that [I Know Who Killed Me] wears its badge of oddness honestly. And I think that's part of the reason why people are still talking about it all these years later," and contemplated writing a sequel, "I've been catching myself pondering the fate that might await Aubrey and Dakota as adults."

In 2022, Lohan also reminisced about taking on the project in an interview with Vogue: "That was really fun to do. It was my first step into doing something different and dark, which was really exciting." In 2023, Cinematic Void included the film in their annual January Giallo series with multiple screenings across the US. On January 30, the American Cinematheque held a Q&A session with Sivertson after a sold out presentation of the film in Los Angeles. In October 2023, IndieWire named I Know Who Killed Me one of the best giallo movies of all time, asserting that "the movie holds up as a shockingly scary and stylish watch today" after being "divorced from [the] vicious media spectacle" it was subjected around its release, as "the premise makes for a twisty, genuinely surprising mystery, and Sivertson's direction is crisp, stylish, and always weird."

=== Accolades ===
I Know Who Killed Me received eight nominations at the 28th Golden Raspberry Awards and won seven. A new category "Worst Excuse for a Horror Movie" was specifically created that year and, consequently, the film set a record for the most Razzie wins in a single year, beating the previous tie held by Battlefield Earth and Showgirls with seven wins each (though Battlefield Earth had more overall wins due to two more awards won in subsequent years). The record for most wins in a single year was broken in 2012 when Jack and Jill won ten awards. Its musical score was nominated as Best Original Score for a Horror/Thriller Film by the International Film Music Critics Association.

Award	Ceremony date	Category	Subject	Result
Golden Raspberry Awards	February 23, 2008	Worst Picture	Frank Mancuso Jr. and David Grace	Won
Golden Raspberry Awards	February 23, 2008	Worst Director	Chris Sivertson	Won
Golden Raspberry Awards	February 23, 2008	Worst Actress	Lindsay Lohan and Lindsay Lohan	Won
Golden Raspberry Awards	February 23, 2008	Worst Supporting Actress	Julia Ormond	Nominated
Golden Raspberry Awards	February 23, 2008	Worst Screenplay	Jeff Hammond	Won
Golden Raspberry Awards	February 23, 2008	Worst Screen Couple	Lindsay Lohan and Lindsay Lohan	Won
Golden Raspberry Awards	February 23, 2008	Worst Remake or Rip-off	Rip-off of Hostel, Saw and The Patty Duke Show	Won
Golden Raspberry Awards	February 23, 2008	Worst Excuse for a Horror Movie		Won
Golden Raspberry Awards	March 6, 2010	Worst Picture of the Decade		Nominated
Golden Raspberry Awards	March 6, 2010	Worst Actress of the Decade	Lindsay Lohan	Nominated
International Film Music Critics Association Awards	February 20, 2008	Best Original Score for a Horror/Thriller Film	Joel McNeely	Nominated

== See also ==
- List of 21st-century films considered the worst
