= Let's Be Cops =

- Theatrical release poster
- Directed by: Luke Greenfield
- Written by: Luke Greenfield; Nicholas Thomas
- Produced by: Luke Greenfield; Simon Kinberg
- Starring: Damon Wayans Jr.; Jake Johnson; Rob Riggle; Nina Dobrev; James D'Arcy; Andy García
- Cinematography: Daryn Okada
- Edited by: Bill Pankow; Jonathan Schwartz
- Music by: Christophe Beck; Jake Monaco
- Production companies: Kinberg Genre; WideAwake
- Distributed by: 20th Century Fox
- Release date: August 13, 2014
- Running time: 104 minutes
- Country: United States
- Language: English
- Budget: $17 million
- Box office: $138.2 million

Let's Be Cops is a 2014 American buddy cop action comedy film co-written and directed by Luke Greenfield. The film stars Damon Wayans Jr. and Jake Johnson as two friends who pretend to be police officers in Los Angeles. The film co-starred Nina Dobrev, Rob Riggle, James D'Arcy, and Andy García. It was filmed on location in Atlanta, Georgia, and released by 20th Century Fox on August 13, 2014. It received negative reviews from critics and grossed $138.2 million worldwide against a production budget of $17 million.

== Plot ==
In Los Angeles, longtime friends Justin Miller, a struggling video game designer, and Ryan O'Malley, an unemployed former college quarterback, recall a pact they once made: if they had not achieved success by age thirty, they would move back to Columbus, Ohio. Leaving a bar, Ryan's car is hit by an intimidating Albanian gang.

After Justin's unsuccessful pitch for a police-themed video game, Ryan convinces him to wear the police uniforms from his presentation as costumes at their college reunion. Confronted with their classmates' success and their own sense of failure, they decide to honor their pact, but are treated like real cops on the street. Enjoying the charade, they kick the Albanian gang out of Georgie's, a restaurant where Justin finally gains the attention of Josie, a waitress he likes.

Ryan doubles down on the hoax, learning official procedures from YouTube and modifying a decommissioned Ford Crown Victoria Police Interceptor to resemble an active Los Angeles Police Department vehicle. Justin reluctantly joins him, and begins a relationship with Josie. During their shenanigans, the friends end up on a real distress call with Patrol Officer Segars. Justin realizes they face serious jail time if exposed, but Josie calls about a man harassing her at the restaurant. He turns out to be Mossi Kasic, the Albanian gang's leader, who intimidates the "officers" into doing nothing.

The friends obtain surveillance equipment from Segars to stakeout Mossi, observing him with an unidentified partner who has been investigating Ryan and Justin, believing them to be federal agents. Mossi receives a shipment of crates, and the friends interrogate the delivery driver, Pupa. Josie, an aspiring makeup artist, helps disguise Justin as Pupa to infiltrate Mossi's club, where Justin is forced to smoke crystal meth and fight in a bare-knuckle boxing match. He and Ryan discover the crates contain guns stolen from police evidence and SWAT equipment and weapons, along with a secret tunnel between Mossi's club and Georgie's restaurant.

Fed up with being in danger, Justin accuses Ryan of filling his own lack of purpose with fake police work, while Ryan criticizes Justin for his cowardice and his inability to stand up for himself, and they part ways. Ryan brings his evidence against Mossi to Segars, who introduces the head of the organized crime unit, Detective Brolin — Mossi's partner.

Recognizing each other, Brolin threatens Ryan, while a newly assertive Justin pitches his game again in uniform. One of Brolin's officers arrives to kill him, inadvertently helping sell the pitch, and Justin escapes but Ryan is abducted by Mossi's men.

Justin calls Segars for help and admits everything, before confessing to Josie that he is not a real cop and entering the tunnel alone. A captive Ryan pits Mossi and Brolin against each other, prompting Mossi to kill Brolin. Justin attempts to save Ryan, but is overpowered. Segars arrives and a gunfight ensues, with Ryan and Justin arming themselves with the stolen SWAT equipment. Cornered by Mossi, they are saved by Segars, who shoots Mossi in the neck and lets the friends go free.

With his newfound confidence, Justin becomes a successful game developer, while a motivated Ryan graduates from the police academy as a full-fledged LAPD officer. Justin apologizes to Josie, and they rekindle their relationship. Ryan arrives with Pupa, his new informant, and drags Justin on a high-speed chase.

== Cast ==
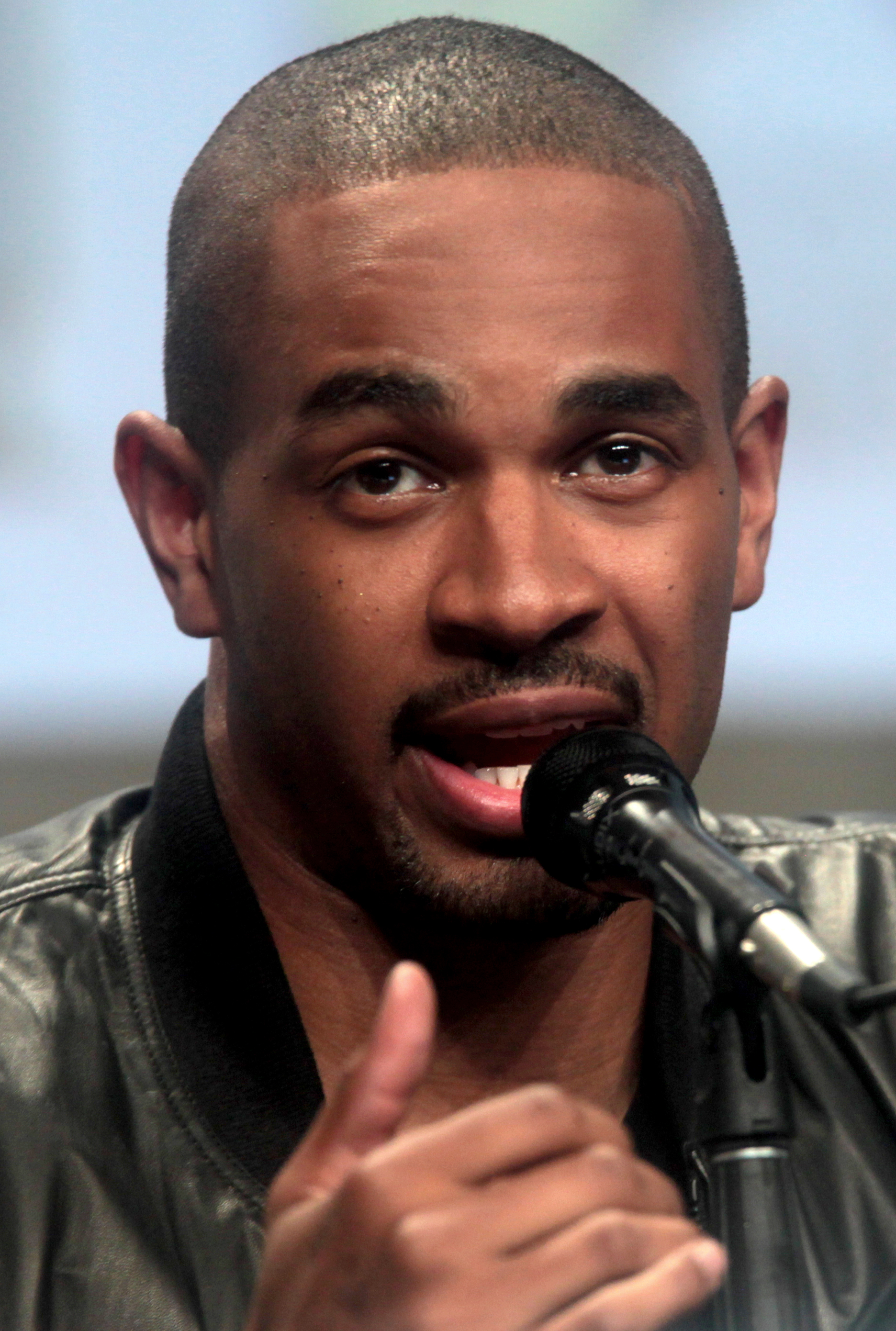
Damon Wayans, Jr. at a panel for the film at San Diego Comic-Con in July 2014

- Damon Wayans Jr. as Justin G. Miller
- Jake Johnson as Ryan J. O'Malley
- Rob Riggle as Patrol Officer Segars
- Nina Dobrev as Josie
- James D'Arcy as Mossi Kasic
- Andy García as Detective Brolin
- Keegan-Michael Key as Pupa
- Jon Lajoie as Todd Connors
- Tom Mardirosian as Georgie
- Natasha Leggero as Annie
- Jeff Chase as Leka

== Production ==
Principal photography began in May 2013 in Atlanta, Georgia, with some of the filming also took place in Charleston, South Carolina, and wrapped up in July.

== Release ==
The film was released on August 13, 2014, with an R rating in the United States and a 15 certificate in the UK.

=== Home media ===
Let's Be Cops was released on DVD and Blu-ray on November 11, 2014, by 20th Century Fox Home Entertainment.

=== Box office ===
Let's Be Cops grossed $82.4 million in North America and $55.8 million in other territories for a total gross of $138.2 million, against a production budget of $17 million.

The film grossed $8.4 million on Wednesday and Thursday, and $17.8 million in its opening weekend, finishing in third at the box office behind Teenage Mutant Ninja Turtles ($28.5 million) and Guardians of the Galaxy ($25.1 million), but the first among the weekend's new releases.

=== Critical response ===
On Rotten Tomatoes, the film has an approval rating of 18% based on 82 reviews and an average rating of 3.86/10. The site's critical consensus reads, "Damon Wayans, Jr. and Jake Johnson have comedic chemistry; unfortunately, Let's Be Cops fails to do anything with it." On Metacritic, the film has a score of 30 out of 100 based on 23 critics, indicating "generally unfavorable" reviews. Audiences polled by CinemaScore gave the film an average grade of "B" on an A+ to F scale.

Joe Leydon of Variety magazine wrote: "The mix of funny business and rough stuff isn't always smooth, but the target audience likely will be amused." Nick de Semlyen of Empire magazine wrote: "Some nice comic beats and a sinister Andy Garcia turn make this far more watchable that the fratty conceit might suggest." Bilge Ebiri of New York Magazine wrote: "Let’s Be Cops has its moments, but it in no way distinguishes itself."

Time magazine placed Let's Be Cops fifth in their ranking of the 10 worst movies of 2014, stating: "The initial setup of Let's Be Cops could have been a funny premise for a B-plot on a show ... but instead, the idea is stretched into a never-ending feature that fails to find any chemistry between Johnson and Wayans".

The movie's release on August 13, 2014, occurring just four days after the fatal shooting of Michael Brown in Ferguson, Missouri, was interpreted by more progressive-leaning media as somewhat ill-timed. In a 2015 interview on Sway in the Morning, Wayans hinted that he would not be interested in a sequel until real-life police brutality was addressed.
