= Captivity (film) =

- Theatrical release poster
- Directed by: Roland Joffé
- Screenplay by: Larry Cohen; Joseph Tura
- Story by: Larry Cohen
- Produced by: Mark Damon; Sergei Konov; Gary Mehlman; Leonid Minkovski
- Starring: Elisha Cuthbert; Daniel Gillies; Pruitt Taylor Vince; Michael Harney; Laz Alonso
- Cinematography: Daniel C. Pearl
- Edited by: Richard Nord
- Music by: Marco Beltrami
- Production companies: After Dark Films; Freestyle Releasing; Foresight Unlimited; Russian American Movie Company
- Distributed by: Lionsgate
- Release date: 13 July 2007
- Running time: 85 minutes
- Countries: United States; Russia
- Language: English
- Budget: $17 million
- Box office: $10.9 million

Captivity is a 2007 horror film directed by Roland Joffé, written by Larry Cohen and Joseph Tura, and starring Elisha Cuthbert, Daniel Gillies, and Pruitt Taylor Vince. Considered an entry into the subgenre of "torture porn", popularized by such film series as Hostel and Saw, the film centres on a young fashion model (Cuthbert) who is abducted and is psychologically tortured by unknown assailants.

Captivity was originally scheduled to be released in North America on 13 May 2007, but its release was delayed after a series of graphic marketing images were released, spurring a reevaluation by the Motion Picture Association of America, who originally granted it an R-rating. The film was ultimately released on 13 July 2007. It received negative reviews from critics and grossed $10.9 million.

== Plot ==
Jennifer Tree is a rising print model in New York City. On an evening out alone, Jennifer is stalked and drugged at a Brooklyn nightclub. She wakes up in a cell containing personal items taken from her apartment. Jennifer is shown recordings of victims who were tortured in the same cell, as well as records of her interviews. She screams and pleads to be let go, but no one replies.

Jennifer is subjected to various forms of psychological torture, including being trapped in a chamber of sand, being forced to consume blended eyeballs and body parts, and having to spare her own life by killing her pet dog. Jennifer discovers that a young man, Gary Dexter, is being held captive in an adjoining cell. The two make contact and attempt to find an escape. They both make it to a garage containing a vehicle, but are knocked out by sleeping gas. Jennifer wakes up in her cell, and sees a recording of Gary being threatened in his cell. Afterwards, he is thrown into her cell. She rushes over to help him, and they proceed to have sex.

After Jennifer drinks a bottle of drugged water and falls asleep, Gary wakes up and leaves the cell. It is revealed Gary and his older brother, Ben, have Jennifer captive in their home; she is the latest of several women they have abducted to re-enact the tortures inflicted upon them as children by their mother. Gary joins Ben and tells him that he is falling in love with Jennifer, then stabs his brother. He watches recordings of him murdering their mother.

Gary is interrupted by two detectives looking for Ben. Despite Gary telling them his brother is not home, the two enter the house. After they accidentally see the surveillance video of Jennifer in her room, Gary shoots them both.

Gary goes back to Jennifer's cell and tells her that he has killed the perpetrators and they can leave. He places Jennifer in a room and tells her to stay there. One of the detectives, having survived the gunshot wound, jumps out at her. Mistaking him for her captor, she kills him with a baseball bat. She then discovers the incriminating photos with Gary in them. Ben, who survived the stabbing, attacks her, and she kills him as well.

Jennifer searches through one of the detectives' pockets. Gary finds her and she says she will help him clean up the mess. When he lets down his guard, she sprays him with pepper spray and runs away, sabotaging the house's electrical system. Eventually, Jennifer kills Gary. She uncovers a window leading outside and stumbles away, unknowingly passing a billboard of one of her print advertisements.

== Cast ==
- Elisha Cuthbert as Jennifer Tree
- Daniel Gillies as Gary Dexter
- Pruitt Taylor Vince as Ben Dexter
- Michael Harney as Detective Bettigey
- Laz Alonso as Detective Ray Di Santos

== Production ==
=== Filming ===
Principal photography of Captivity took place largely in Moscow, Russia in 2005. The film was shot by cinematographer Daniel Pearl, who had filmed the original The Texas Chain Saw Massacre (1974) and its 2003 remake.

=== Re-editing ===
After the film screened at the 2006 Sitges Film Festival, it was acquired by After Dark Films, whose founder and studio head Courtney Solomon went back to edit the finished film to incorporate more gore and violence to please the American audience. In a statement, Solomon is believed to state that he felt the film was not gruesome enough for a mainstream "torture porn". He felt the change would bring in more money for the film, after noticing the success of Hostel; however, the film performed poorly at the box office. Solomon later released a statement saying, "It's overkill. I think audiences have said, 'I've had enough.' It's as simple as that."

== Release ==
=== Marketing controversy ===
The controversial advertisement on a billboard in Los Angeles

In March 2007, controversial images depicting promotional scenes from the film were released by After Dark Films in Los Angeles and New York, where they were shown on billboards and taxicabs. The advertisement consisted of pictures involving the kidnapping, torture, and presumable murder of Cuthbert's character. Offended witnesses soon filed complaints to After Dark, who claimed it had been an error and explained that the concept was only one of several working ideas that were being considered for marketing to the general public. According to executive producer Courtney Solomon, who spoke on behalf of After Dark, it was not supposed to have been approved; he followed by saying, "To be honest with you, I don't know where the confusion happened or who's responsible."

"This film was done in association with After Dark Films. The nature of the association allows After Dark autonomy over their marketing materials, and therefore we neither saw nor approved this billboard before it was posted," said Peter Wilkes, head of Lionsgate investor relations. "Once aware of the materials and the reaction to them, we immediately asked After Dark to remove the billboards, to which they immediately and cooperatively responded."

=== Rating and release delay ===
Joss Whedon became the public face of a movement directed at the MPAA to remove the film's rating, in accordance with MPAA guidelines that state that any film that uses advertising that has not been approved by the MPAA (in this case, the advertising was specifically disapproved) will possibly forfeit their right to be rated. According to writer Joey Soloway, who runs the website Remove the Rating, Solomon himself was responsible for the ads in question, going over the design in extreme detail, and is thus being disingenuous in the above-cited quote. The MPAA issued a ruling dated 28 March 2007, which said that, as punishment, it would not consider rating the film until at least 30 April, making the release date of 18 May less likely (because releasing the film "unrated" would greatly impact its potential to sell tickets). The MPAA is also, in an unprecedented move, requiring that they approve the placement of all forthcoming advertisements for the film.

=== Home media ===
The film was released on DVD on October 30, 2007.

== Reception ==
=== Box office ===
The film grossed $1,429,100 in its opening weekend, placing it at No. 12 at the US box office. By the end of its run, the film had grossed $10,921,200.

=== Critical response ===
Captivity opened on Friday, 13 July 2007, and was panned by critics. The film holds a 9% approval rating on Rotten Tomatoes based on 77 reviews. The site's consensus reads: "Lacking scares or psychological insight, Captivity is a distasteful entry in the 'torture porn' subgenre." Online critic James Berardinelli gave it a zero star rating, stating that there is "nothing redeemable here. It's not tense or scary; it's just demented". Bloody-Disgusting named the film as the "worst horror film of 2007". Joe Leydon of Variety wrote that it will likely be remembered more for the billboard controversy than its plot, but it still generates "modest suspense after a predictable but effective plot twist".

Mark Kermode described the film as a 'Grotty, nasty, sleazy, infantile piece of dung'. Jeanette Catsoulis of The New York Times wrote that lead actress Cuthbert "knows the victim ropes better than most," but derided the film's narrative, which she described as "a punish-the-tease tale of exhausting repetitiveness... Larry Cohen’s script is trapped in a tedious loop of drugging and threatening."

=== Accolades ===
Award/association	Year	Category	Recipient(s) and nominee(s)	Result	Ref.
Golden Raspberry Awards	2008	Worst Director	Roland Joffé	Nominated	
Golden Raspberry Awards	2008	Worst Excuse for a Horror Movie		Nominated	
Golden Raspberry Awards	2008	Worst Actress	Elisha Cuthbert	Nominated	
Teen Choice Awards	2007	Choice Horror/Thriller Movie Actress	Elisha Cuthbert	Nominated	
Women Film Critics Circle	2007	Hall of Shame Award		Won	
