= Popular Mechanics for Kids =

- Opening logo
- Starring: Elisha Cuthbert; Jay Baruchel; Tyler Kyte; Vanessa Lengies; Charles Powell
- Country of origin: Canada
- Original language: English
- No. of seasons: 4
- No. of episodes: 72

Production
- Producer: Jonathan Finkelstein
- Running time: 23 minutes (approx.)
- Production companies: Global Television Network; Hearst Entertainment

Original release
- Network: Global TV
- Release: 7 September 1997 – 8 October 2000

Popular Mechanics for Kids (sometimes abbreviated to PMK) is a Canadian educational television program based on the Popular Mechanics magazine. The program aired on Global TV from 1997 until 2000, with re-runs airing on BBC Kids Canada until its closure in 2018. Original cast included Elisha Cuthbert, Jay Baruchel, Tyler Kyte, Vanessa Lengies, and Charles Powell.

== Overview ==
The intent of Popular Mechanics for Kids was to teach children how things work. Episodes covered a wide range of topics, including animals, body systems, amusement parks, electricity and airplanes.

Each episode was led by hosts Jay (Season 1), Elisha, Tyler (Seasons 2–4) and Vanessa (Seasons 3–4), who would embark on adventures around the world which relate to the central theme of each episode. Sketch comedy segments were incorporated to balance out the educational content.

"Mechanix with Nix and Tix" (usually shortened to just "Nix and Tix") was an animation segment that used slapstick comedy to help further educate and entertain the viewers about the episode's theme.

During the segment "Charlie's Experiment/Tip", actor Charles Powell would answer questions, teach, and demonstrate an experiment related to the topic of the episode. It was common for real children to participate and ask questions in this segment, but in later seasons, only Powell was included. Powell, being the only recurring adult character in the show, would often serve as a mentor for the audience and hosts, teaching concepts such as fire and personal safety.

== Episodes ==
Season	Episodes	Originally aired (Canadian air dates)	
Season	Episodes	Season premiere	Season finale
1	22	September 7, 1997	February 8, 1998
2	22	September 6, 1998	January 31, 1999
3	22	September 5, 1999	January 30, 2000
4	6	September 3, 2000	October 8, 2000

== Cast ==
Popular Mechanics for Kids cast (from left to right: Charles Powell, Vanessa Lengies, Tyler Kyte, Elisha Cuthbert).

- Elisha Cuthbert (co-host, Seasons 1–4)
- Jay Baruchel (co-host, Season 1)
- Tyler Kyte (co-host, Seasons 2–4)
- Vanessa Lengies (co-host, Seasons 3–4)
- Charles Powell ("Charlie's Experiment/Tip", Seasons 1–4).

== Honours ==
It was awarded the Parents Choice Award in 2003, and was nominated for the Gemini Awards.

== Production ==
The show was filmed primarily in Montreal, Quebec. It was produced by the Global Television Network in Canada, Hearst Entertainment in the U.S., and finally TVA International in Canada for the final episodes in 2000.

In 1997, the cast, crew and production team embarked on a three-day filming expedition aboard the American aircraft carrier USS Dwight D. Eisenhower in Virginia, to capture footage for an upcoming episode centered on aircraft carriers. Other notable locations visited include the Royal Canadian Mint, the Lyndon B. Johnson Space Center, and W. M. Keck Observatory.

== Telecast and home media ==
The show aired in syndication in the U.S. (including Hearst-owned television stations), before moving to Discovery Kids on Saturday mornings by the program's final season in 2000. Repeats of the show continued to air on many channels until 2008. Re-runs were aired on BBC Kids and Discovery Kids in Canada until December 31, 2009. After the closure of Discovery Kids in Canada, BBC Kids stopped airing repeats in all countries (except Canada). The repeats on BBC Kids in Canada ended on May 14, 2011. In the U.S., the show can currently be streamed on Tubi and The Roku Channel.

A number of VHS copies and DVDs have been released by Koch Vision and E1 Entertainment:

- Slither and Slime and Other Yucky Things
- Radical Rockets and Other Cool Cruising Machines
- Rip Roaring Rollercoasters and All Access to Fun
- Gators, Dragons and Other Wild Beasts
- Super Sea Creatures and Awesome Ocean Adventures
- Lightning and Other Forces of Nature
- X-Treme Rides
- Roller Coasters
- Firefighters and Other Lifesaving Heroes
- Zoos
- Garbage
- Popular Mechanics For Kids: 4 DVD Box Set
- Popular Mechanics For Kids: 6 DVD Box Set
- Popular Mechanics For Kids: The Complete First Season
- Popular Mechanics For Kids: The Complete Second Season
- Popular Mechanics For Kids: The Complete Third Season
- Popular Mechanics For Kids: The Complete Fourth Season
- How Do They Build Bridges
- How Do They Build Skyscrapers
- How Do They Build Tunnels
- How Do They Build Spaceships
