= 2005 MTV Movie Awards =

American awards show

- Date: Saturday, June 4, 2005
- Location: Shrine Auditorium, Los Angeles, California
- Country: United States
- Hosted by: Jimmy Fallon

Television/radio coverage
- Network: MTV

The 2005 MTV Movie Awards was hosted by Jimmy Fallon. The ceremony aired on MTV on Saturday, June 4, 2005 from the Shrine Auditorium in Los Angeles, California. A special award, the Silver Bucket of Excellence, was presented to the 1985 film The Breakfast Club. Also, Tom Cruise was presented with the first-ever MTV Generation Award. Neither of these two special awards were voted upon by the public. The awards were also marked by Nine Inch Nails' decision to pull out because MTV refused to let them perform using as a backdrop an unaltered image of President George W. Bush. Frontman Trent Reznor commented, "apparently the image of our president is as offensive to MTV as it is to me". Foo Fighters replaced them. Anchorman and Mean Girls were the most nominated films, each receiving four nominations.

== Performers ==
- Eminem — "Ass Like That" / "Mockingbird"
- Mariah Carey — "We Belong Together"
- Yellowcard — "Don't You (Forget About Me)"
- Foo Fighters — "Best of You"

== Presenters ==
- Chris Rock and Adam Sandler — presented Best On-Screen Team
- Vin Diesel and Jennifer Connelly — presented Best Villain
- Nicole Kidman — presented Breakthrough Female Performance
- Jessica Alba, Chris Evans, Michael Chiklis, Ioan Gruffudd, and Julian McMahon — presented Breakthrough Male Performance
- Rob Schneider and Eva Mendes — presented Best Comedic Performance
- Terrence Howard and Jimmy Fallon — introduced Mariah Carey
- Sandra Bullock and Jimmy Fallon — presented Best Male Performance
- Emile Hirsch and Jessica Biel — presented Best Frightened Performance
- Hilary Swank — presented Silver Bucket of Excellence Award and introduced Yellowcard
- Paul Walker and Zhang Ziyi — presented Best Kiss
- Katie Holmes — presented MTV Generation Award
- Johnny Knoxville, Seann William Scott, and Jessica Simpson — presented Best Musical Sequence
- Dwayne Johnson — presented Best Fight
- Samuel L. Jackson — presented Best Female Performance
- Hilary Duff — introduced Foo Fighters
- Tom Cruise and Dakota Fanning — presented Best Movie

== Awards ==
Below are the list of nominations. Winners are listed at the top of each list in bold.

=== Best Movie ===
- **Napoleon Dynamite**
- Kill Bill: Volume 2
- Spider-Man 2
- Ray
- The Incredibles

=== Best Male Performance ===
- **Leonardo DiCaprio – The Aviator**
- Jamie Foxx – Ray
- Will Smith – Hitch
- Brad Pitt – Troy
- Matt Damon – The Bourne Supremacy

=== Best Female Performance ===
- **Lindsay Lohan – Mean Girls**
- Uma Thurman – Kill Bill: Volume 2
- Hilary Swank – Million Dollar Baby
- Rachel McAdams – The Notebook
- Natalie Portman – Garden State

=== Breakthrough Male ===
- **Jon Heder – Napoleon Dynamite**
- Tim McGraw – Friday Night Lights
- Zach Braff – Garden State
- Freddie Highmore – Finding Neverland
- Tyler Perry – Diary of a Mad Black Woman

=== Breakthrough Female ===
- **Rachel McAdams – Mean Girls**
- Ashanti – Coach Carter
- Elisha Cuthbert – The Girl Next Door
- Bryce Dallas Howard – The Village
- Emmy Rossum – The Day After Tomorrow

=== Best On-Screen Team ===
- **Lindsay Lohan, Rachel McAdams, Lacey Chabert and Amanda Seyfried (The Plastics) – Mean Girls**
- Craig T. Nelson, Holly Hunter, Spencer Fox and Sarah Vowell (The Incredibles) – The Incredibles
- Will Ferrell, Paul Rudd, Steve Carell and David Koechner (The Channel 4 News Team) - Anchorman: The Legend of Ron Burgundy
- Vince Vaughn, Christine Taylor, Rip Torn, Justin Long, Alan Tudyk, Joel David Moore, Chris Williams and Stephen Root (The Average Joes) – Dodgeball: A True Underdog Story
- John Cho and Kal Penn – Harold & Kumar Go to White Castle

=== Best Villain ===
- **Ben Stiller – Dodgeball: A True Underdog Story**
- Tom Cruise – Collateral
- Rachel McAdams – Mean Girls
- Jim Carrey – Lemony Snicket's A Series of Unfortunate Events
- Alfred Molina – Spider-Man 2

=== Best Comedic Performance ===
- **Dustin Hoffman – Meet the Fockers**
- Antonio Banderas – Shrek 2
- Will Ferrell – Anchorman: The Legend of Ron Burgundy
- Ben Stiller – Dodgeball: A True Underdog Story
- Will Smith – Hitch

=== Best Frightened Performance ===
Note: (Note: New category added that year.)

- **Dakota Fanning – Hide and Seek**
- Cary Elwes – Saw
- Sarah Michelle Gellar – The Grudge
- Jennifer Tilly – Seed of Chucky
- Mýa – Cursed

=== Best Kiss ===
- **Rachel McAdams and Ryan Gosling – The Notebook**
- Natalie Portman and Zach Braff – Garden State
- Gwyneth Paltrow and Jude Law – Sky Captain and the World of Tomorrow
- Jennifer Garner and Natassia Malthe – Elektra
- Elisha Cuthbert and Emile Hirsch – The Girl Next Door

=== Best Action Sequence ===
- **Destruction of Los Angeles – The Day After Tomorrow**
- The Subway Battle – Spider-Man 2
- Beverly Hills Plane Crash – The Aviator
- The Moscow Car Chase – The Bourne Supremacy
- The Desert Terrorist Assault – Team America: World Police

=== Best Musical Sequence ===
- **Jon Heder — "Canned Heat" (from Napoleon Dynamite)**
- Jennifer Garner and Mark Ruffalo — "Thriller" (from 13 Going on 30)
- Will Ferrell, Paul Rudd, Steve Carell and David Koechner — "Afternoon Delight" (from Anchorman: The Legend of Ron Burgundy)
- John Cho and Kal Penn — "Hold On" (from Harold & Kumar Go to White Castle)

=== Best Fight ===
- **Uma Thurman vs. Daryl Hannah – Kill Bill: Volume 2**
- The Battle of the News Teams – Anchorman: The Legend of Ron Burgundy
- Brad Pitt vs. Eric Bana – Troy
- Zhang Ziyi vs. Emperor's Guards – House of Flying Daggers

=== Best Video Game Based on a Movie ===
Note:

- **The Chronicles of Riddick: Escape from Butcher Bay**
- Spider-Man 2
- Van Helsing
- Harry Potter and the Prisoner of Azkaban
- The Incredibles

=== MTV Generation Award ===
- **Tom Cruise**

=== Silver Bucket of Excellence ===
- **The Breakfast Club**

== Shorts ==
- "Tankman Begins"
- "Star Wars: Episode III - Revenge of the Sith "
