= Half Brothers =

American comedy film

- Theatrical release poster
- Directed by: Luke Greenfield
- Screenplay by: Eduardo Cisneros; Jason Shuman
- Story by: Ali LeRoi; Eduardo Cisneros
- Produced by: Jason Shuman; Eduardo Cisneros; Luke Greenfield; Jason Benoit
- Starring: Luis Gerardo Méndez; Connor Del Rio
- Cinematography: Thomas Scott Stanton
- Edited by: Joe Mitacek
- Music by: Jordan Seigel
- Production companies: Jason Shuman Productions; Eduardo Cisneros Productions
- Distributed by: Focus Features (United States); Universal Pictures (International)
- Release date: December 4, 2020
- Running time: 96 minutes
- Country: United States
- Languages: English; Spanish
- Box office: $3.3 million

Half Brothers is a 2020 American road comedy-drama film directed by Luke Greenfield from a screenplay by Eduardo Cisneros and Jason Shuman. Starring Luis Gerardo Méndez, Connor Del Rio, José Zúñiga, Vincent Spano, Pia Watson and Juan Pablo Espinosa, the film centers on two half-brothers taking on a road trip across the country to solve clues left by their dying father.

The film was released on December 4, 2020, by Focus Features.

== Plot ==
Renato, working in an aviation company as a business executive, receives a call from a woman named Katherine. She informs him that his father, Flavio is ill and wishes for him to visit him in Chicago where he currently resides. Renato reluctantly agrees, having had a grudge with Flavio for not returning to him after immigrating to the United States during the Mexican currency crisis. He arrives at a hospital and learns he has a half-brother named Asher, a man Renato initially crossed paths at the coffee shop but is unaware of his existence. Flavio request his brothers to deliver an envelope (with the word "Eloise") to a man in St. Louis named Evaristo. While Asher accepts, Renato berates him, but after visiting his wake, he begrudgingly obliges.

On the trip to St. Louis, Asher makes a detour to steal a goat, whom he names "Renatito", from a local ranch belonging to a group of armed men. The brothers escape, but this angers Renato and the two brothers have a scuffle. The two eventually arrive at an old factory in St. Louis that produces radio-controlled planes that Renato used to play with Flavio. Directed by one of the employees to a Mexican bar, he finds Evaristo, a friend of Flavio's who also immigrated to the United States with him.

Evaristo explains that he and Flavio worked in the dilapidated factory as cheap laborers, but Flavio manages to revitalize it by making RC planes with the support of his business partner, Katherine. Their professional relationship eventually turned into a one-night stand, at which Renato decided to leave to return to Mexico. He then gives the brothers a second clue; an envelope written with "Mr. B" containing a pawnshop claim ticket–the brothers deduce that the pawnshop is located in Oklahoma City.

When they arrive, Mr. B hands them Flavio's wedding ring and explains that he pawned it for money after Flavio was mugged on his way to the border. However, before he could get there, border agents arrest him and is thrown into a holding cell. He then gives the brothers a third clue, a photo of a covenant in El Paso. Renato becomes impatient and attempts to return to Mexico, but discovers that his passport is missing.

Driving to El Paso, Asher's car runs out of fuel; they spot an unlocked cabin full of ethanol, which Renato plans to process into gasoline. When he learns that Asher threw away his passports to prevent him from leaving, he locks him in the bathroom and attempt to drive back home but is apprehended by border guards and is forced to spend a night in the cell with undocumented immigrants. Asher bails him out the next day and reveals that the cabin they broke into belonged to a group of rednecks they earlier encountered and has taken his goat "Renatito" captive. The two brothers return to the cabin and fill it with ethanol vapor to knock out the rednecks, freeing "Renatito".

As they reach El Paso, Renato–deciding to pursue for the final clue, is given a DVD video from Flavio. He explains that, after he was thrown away by the guards, he is found care by the nuns at the nearby convent. Though he made a recovery, he learns from Katherine that she has given birth to Asher. Already torn over having to leave behind another son, he calls his old wife to inform her that he will not be coming home, and that was when Renato stopped caring for him. He further explains that while he loved Asher, he became distant when his flamboyant and carefree personality makes him different to Renato. He closes the message by explaining that he orchestrated the entire journey in hopes that they can not only forgive him but grow as brothers.

The nun then shows the brothers that "Eloise" is really a full-size plane Flavio built for his sons. Now with a way to return to Mexico, Renato invites both Asher and "Renatito" to his upcoming wedding, and they fly away together above the Sumidero Canyon, where Renato and Flavio had once dreamed of flying there. As Renato and Pamela get married, their son, Emilio, flies his toy plane and crashes into a nearby shack, prompting everyone who witnessed the accident to run.

== Cast ==
- Luis Gerardo Méndez as Renato
  - Ian Inigo as the Young Renato
- Connor Del Rio as Asher
- José Zúñiga as Evaristo
- Vincent Spano as Mr. B
- Pia Watson as Pamela
- Juan Pablo Espinosa as Flavio
- Jwaundace Candece as Doris

== Production ==
In May 2019, it was announced Luis Gerardo Méndez had joined the cast of the film, with Luke Greenfield directing from a screenplay by Eduardo Cisneros and Jason Shuman with Focus Features producing and distributing. In June 2019, Connor Del Rio joined the cast of the film. In August 2019, Pia Watson, Juan Pablo Espinosa and Vincent Spano joined the cast of the film.

Principal photography began in New Mexico in July 2019, and lasted 31 days.

== Reception ==
=== Box office ===
The film grossed $720,000 from 1,369 theaters in its opening weekend, finishing second at the box office. It remained in second in its sophomore weekend, falling 30% to $490,000. On its third weekend it earned $200,000 more.

=== Critical response ===
On review aggregator website Rotten Tomatoes, the film holds an approval rating of 36% and an average rating of 5.2/10, based on 45 reviews. The site's critics consensus reads: "Half road trip comedy, half family drama, Half Brothers adds up to a less-than-halfway-entertaining look at immigration through the experiences of two siblings." According to Metacritic, which sampled seven critics and calculated a weighted average score of 30 out of 100, the film received "generally unfavorable" reviews. Audiences polled by CinemaScore gave the film an average grade of "B" on an A+ to F scale, while PostTrak reported 77% of audience members gave the film a positive score, with 47% saying they would definitely recommend it.

== See also ==
- Rain Man
