= The Girl Next Door (2004 film) =

2004 film by Luke Greenfield

- Theatrical release poster
- Directed by: Luke Greenfield
- Screenplay by: Stuart Blumberg; David T. Wagner; Brent Goldberg; Luke Greenfield (Note: Uncredited.); Chris McKenna
- Story by: David T. Wagner; Brent Goldberg
- Produced by: Harry Gittes; Charles Gordon; Marc Sternberg
- Starring: Emile Hirsch; Elisha Cuthbert; Timothy Olyphant; James Remar; Chris Marquette; Paul Dano
- Cinematography: Jamie Anderson
- Edited by: Mark Livolsi
- Music by: Paul Haslinger
- Production companies: Regency Enterprises; New Regency; Daybreak
- Distributed by: 20th Century Fox
- Release dates: February 18, 2004 (Texas Film Festival); April 9, 2004 (U.S.)
- Running time: 109 minutes
- Country: United States
- Language: English
- Budget: $20–25 million
- Box office: $30.4 million

The Girl Next Door is a 2004 American romantic sex comedy film directed by Luke Greenfield and written by David Wagner, Brent Goldberg, and Stuart Blumberg, and starring Emile Hirsch, Elisha Cuthbert, Timothy Olyphant, James Remar, Chris Marquette, and Paul Dano. The story follows Matthew Kidman, a high school senior who falls in love with his new neighbor, Danielle, and discovers she is a former adult film actress. It marked Olivia Wilde's film debut.

Development for The Girl Next Door began as early as 2001. The film's screenplay was partly inspired by Risky Business (1983). Principal photography occurred primarily in Los Angeles County, California and Las Vegas. The film features cinematography by Eric Alan Edwards and a score by Paul Haslinger.

The Girl Next Door premiered at the Texas Film Festival on February 18, 2004, before being theatrically distributed nationwide by 20th Century Fox on April 9, 2004. It received mixed reviews, with critics praising for its performances, but criticism for tonal inconsistencies, and underperformed at the box office. However, The Girl Next Door later gained a cult following through home media and television, with retrospective appreciation for its genre subversion and portrayal of the adult entertainment industry.

== Plot ==
Matthew Kidman, an ambitious high school senior in suburban California, has been accepted to Georgetown University but lacks the funds to attend. As class president, he raises $25,000 to help a Cambodian student, Samnang Sok, study in the United States, but feels his own high school experience has been uneventful. His closest friends, Eli Brooks and Tim Klitz, are more focused on mischief and adult films than academics or self-reflection.

Matthew's routine changes when Danielle Clark, an attractive young woman, moves in next door. After a series of playful and flirtatious interactions, the two begin a tentative romance. Their relationship is disrupted when Matthew learns from Eli that Danielle is a former adult film actress. Following misguided advice from his friend, Matthew takes Danielle to a motel and treats her inappropriately, leading her to end the relationship and consider returning to the adult industry.

Determined to make amends, Matthew tracks Danielle to an adult film convention in Las Vegas, where he confronts her former producer and ex-boyfriend, Kelly Simon. Despite Kelly's threats, Matthew convinces Danielle to leave the industry. Days later, Kelly retaliates by abducting Matthew and coercing him into stealing from a rival producer, Hugo Posh. After narrowly escaping police capture, Matthew arrives at a scholarship dinner under the influence of ecstasy and gives an impromptu speech but fails to secure the award.

Kelly escalates the conflict by posing as a school advisor and stealing the $25,000 fund. To recover the money and clear Matthew's name, Danielle proposes producing an adult film featuring her former colleagues and Matthew's classmates during their senior prom. Eli directs the film, and Klitz unexpectedly steps into a key role. The project is a success, and Matthew and Danielle have sex.

The next day, Kelly arrives at Matthew's home with a copy of the film, threatening to expose him and ruin his chances of attending Georgetown. However, upon viewing it, Matthew's parents and principal are surprised to find that it is a modern sex education video. Realizing the film's value, they reluctantly support its distribution. Kelly, impressed by Matthew's cleverness, begrudgingly concedes defeat.

Matthew partners with Hugo to distribute the film, earning more than enough to fund Samnang's education and pay for his tuition. He also sends Kelly a box of cigars, thereby burying the hatchet between them. Eli begins a promising film career immediately after High School, Klitz gains new confidence from his role in the adult film, and Matthew departs for Georgetown with Danielle by his side.

== Cast ==
- Emile Hirsch as Matthew Kidman
- Elisha Cuthbert as Danielle Clark
- Timothy Olyphant as Kelly Simon
- James Remar as Hugo Posh
- Chris Marquette as Eli Brooks
- Paul Dano as Tim Klitz
- Ulysses Lee as Samnang Sok
- Harris Laskawy as Principal Salinger
- Autumn Reeser as Jane
- Olivia Wilde as Kellie
- Amanda Swisten as April
- Sung-Hi Lee as Ferrari
- Timothy Bottoms as Mr. Kidman
- Donna Bullock as Mrs. Kidman
- Richard Fancy as Mr. Peterson
- Catherine McGoohan as Mrs. Peterson
- Jacob Young as Hunter Mccaffrey
- Luther Reigns as Mule
- Maria Arcé as chloe
- Sunny Leone as herself

== Production ==
=== Development ===
In May 2001, it was reported that Luke Greenfield was developing the teen comedy film The Girl Next Door, which Greenfield co-scripted with Chris McKenna, at 20th Century Fox-based production company Regency Enterprises. Greenfield had held on to the script for over a year hoping to make a film in the vein of Risky Business.

Commenting on the film's original screenplay, Greenfield said: "It was a different film. It was very tawdry, a teen sex comedy. It was just nothing like what I wanted to do. But the premise, of a kid falling in love with a porn star who moves in next door and is trying to escape her past, really excited me on a number of levels." The screenplay was reworked with contributions from Stuart Blumberg. While Greenfield and McKenna contributed to the film's story and screenplay, neither were credited; Blumberg, David T. Wagner, and Brent Goldberg received screenwriting credit. Greenfield noted: "I directed the movie, so at least I got credit, but Chris really got screwed. He really did. He never got his name on it."

=== Casting ===
Greenfield auditioned a number of actors for the film, including Katherine Heigl and Chris Evans. In October 2002, it was reported that Emile Hirsch and Elisha Cuthbert had signed on to star in the film as Matthew and Danielle, respectively. Hirsch was cast after Greenfield saw an audition tape he had recorded for Gus Van Sant's Elephant (2003). For the role of Danielle, the studio originally sought Katie Holmes, but Greenfield insisted on casting Cuthbert, who had recently completed Old School (2003). "She was so hungry. I remember meeting her and she had done so much preparation," Greenfield recalled. "She had all these pictures of different looks that Danielle would have. She was 20 years old at the time. She was talking about the character and she had such maturity".

Timothy Olyphant was cast in the role of Danielle's ex-boyfriend and manager, Kelly, after Brad Pitt passed on the project. Olivia Wilde, who had originally worked as a casting intern on the project, made her screen debut in the film in a minor role as high school student Kellie.

=== Filming ===
The Girl Next Door was shot in Southern California, including in Long Beach, Glendale, and Pasadena. Some filming was completed at the Huntington Library and Doheny Library at the University of Southern California. Additional photography occurred on the Paramount Ranch. Principal photography began in January 2003.

== Soundtrack ==
An official soundtrack for the film was released on March 30, 2004, by Lakeshore Records.

The Girl Next Door

Soundtrack album by Various
- Released: March 30, 2004
- Length: 1:13:33
- Label: Lakeshore Records

No.	Title	Artist	Length
1.	"The Plan"	Paul Haslinger	1:03
2.	"Take a Picture"	Filter	6:03
3.	"Something in the Air"	Thunderclap Newman	3:58
4.	"Peeping Matt"	Paul Haslinger	0:51
5.	"Dick Dagger's Theme"	Pornosonic	3:10
6.	"Dopes to Infinity"	Monster Magnet	5:47
7.	"Carpe Beachum"	Paul Haslinger	0:41
8.	"Electric Lady Land"	Fantastic Plastic Machine	4:20
9.	"Break Down the Walls"	Youth of Today	2:06
10.	"Jump into the Fire"	Harry Nilsson	7:03
11.	"Spin Spin Sugar (Radio Edit)"	Sneaker Pimps	3:35
12.	"Get Naked"	Methods of Mayhem	3:23
13.	"The Killing Moon"	Echo & the Bunnymen	5:49
14.	"Big Muff"	Pepe Deluxé	4:48
15.	"Sparrows Over Birmingham"	Josh Rouse	5:00
16.	"BankMeltdown"	Paul Haslinger	2:30
17.	"Think Twice"	Ralph Myerz and the Jack Herren Band	6:17
18.	"Sweet Home Alabama"	Lynyrd Skynyrd	4:47
19.	"The End"	Paul Haslinger	2:32
Total length:			1:13:33

Songs featured but not included on soundtrack: (Note: Adapted from end credits.)

- "I Believe in a Thing Called Love" by The Darkness
- "Under Pressure" by Queen and David Bowie – Opening scene
- "Angeles" by Elliott Smith
- "The Field" by Christopher Tyng
- "Slayed" by Overseer – Matthew and Danielle entering the party
- "No Retreat" by Dilated Peoples
- "If It Feels Good Do It" by Sloan
- "Bendy Karate" by Phreak E.D.
- "Suffering" by Satchel
- "Song for a Blue Guitar" by Red House Painters
- "Twilight Zone" by 2 Unlimited – Heading to Vegas
- "Mondo '77" by Looper – Matthew sees Athena (Danielle)
- "This Beat Is Hot" by B.G. The Prince of Rap
- "Turn of the Century" by Pete Yorn
- "Stay in School" by Richard Patrick
- "Funk #49" by James Gang
- "Lady Marmalade" by Patti LaBelle – Matthew dancing at scholarship dinner
- "Christmas Song" by Mogwai
- "Arrival" by Mark Kozelek
- "What's Going On" by Marvin Gaye
- "Counterfeit" by Limp Bizkit (not credited)
- "Mannish Boy" by Muddy Waters – Danielle opening the door before the cameras
- "Purple Haze" by Groove Armada
- "Lapdance" by N.E.R.D. – Entering the cafeteria on prom night
- "Everytime I Think of You (I Get High)" by Phreak E.D.
- "Lucky Man" by The Verve – Matthew and Danielle dancing in prom night
- "Atlantis" by Donovan – completing the shooting and leaving cafeteria on prom night
- "This Year's Love" by David Gray – Matthew and Danielle kiss at party and have sex in the limousine
- "Baba O'Riley" by The Who – Ending scenes
- "Maybe You're Gone" by Binocular – Credits
- "One Fine Day" by Alastair Binks – Credits

== Release ==
The Girl Next Door premiered at the Texas Film Festival at Texas A&M University on February 18, 2004, followed by sneak previews in select cities on March 20, 2004. It was subsequently theatrically released in the United States by 20th Century Fox on April 9, 2004, opening in 2,148 theaters.

=== Home video and rights ===
On August 24, 2004, 20th Century Fox Home Entertainment released an unrated version of the film on DVD. 20th Century Fox Home Entertainment also released this unrated version on Blu-ray on September 1, 2009.

In 2019, Rupert Murdoch sold most of 21st Century Fox's film and television assets to Disney. However, much of The Girl Next Door's underlying rights were with production company Regency Enterprises rather than Fox, and Twentieth Century Fox Film Corporation are not mentioned as one of the copyright holders in the credits. At the time of the sale, Fox had a 20% stake in Regency Enterprises, and this 20% stake was transferred to Disney when they purchased the Fox entertainment assets.

== Reception ==
=== Box office ===
The Girl Next Door grossed $14.6 million in the United States and Canada, and $15.8 million in international markets, for a worldwide total of approximately $30.4 million.

=== Critical response ===
On the review aggregator Rotten Tomatoes, the film holds an approval rating of 56% based on 159 reviews, with an average score of 5.6/10. The website's consensus reads, "The movie borrows heavily from Risky Business (1983), though Emile Hirsch and Elisha Cuthbert are appealing leads." Metacritic reports a weighted average score of 47 out of 100, based on 32 critics, indicating "mixed or average reviews." Audiences polled by CinemaScore gave the film an average grade of "B+" on an A+ to F scale.

Sheri Linden of The Hollywood Reporter praised the film as a "sharp, vivacious comedy." Desson Thomson of The Washington Post described it as "an entertaining affair whose wild-card creativity never ceases to surprise." Writing for Entertainment Weekly, Owen Gleiberman gave the film a "B−", noting that while it was derivative, "this genial cardboard knockoff is contrived from the start but gets better as it goes along."

In a more mixed review, Joe Leydon of Variety criticized the film's "shamelessly derivative" script, drawing comparisons to Risky Business, American Pie (1999), and 1980s teen romances. He described the lead performances as "attractive but bland," though he praised Timothy Olyphant's "scene-stealing turn." A. O. Scott of The New York Times observed that the film presents a "nonjudgmental, even celebratory" view of pornography but noted a contradictory tone in portraying Danielle as someone in need of rescue. He concluded that the film "wallow[s]" in its own contradiction without offering much genuine pleasure. Roger Ebert of the Chicago Sun-Times gave the film one and a half stars out of four, calling it a "nasty piece of business" and criticizing its misleading marketing as a teen comedy.

=== Accolades ===
Institution	Year	Category	Recipient(s)	Result	Ref.
MTV Movie Awards	2005	Best Kiss	Elisha Cuthbert; Emile Hirsch	Nominated	
MTV Movie Awards	2005	Best Breakthrough Performance	Elisha Cuthbert	Nominated	
Teen Choice Awards	2004	Choice Movie Your Parents Didn't Want You to See	The Girl Next Door	Nominated	

=== Legacy ===
The Girl Next Door has developed a cult following in the years since its release.
