= Luke Greenfield =

American film director and screenwriter (born 1972)

- Born: February 5, 1972 (age 54); Manhasset, New York, U.S.
- Education: USC School of Cinematic Arts (attended)
- Occupations: Film director, producer, screenwriter
- Years active: 1989–present

Luke Greenfield (born February 5, 1972) is an American filmmaker. He is best known for directing the 2004 film The Girl Next Door. Greenfield directed the pilot episode of the television series Aliens in America and produced the film Role Models. In 2014, he co-wrote, produced and directed the film Let's Be Cops.

== Early life ==
Greenfield was born in Manhasset, New York and was raised in Westport, Connecticut. After graduating from Staples High School, he next attended USC School of Cinema-Television where he made several student films including "Alive & Kicking," which won awards at many film festivals.

He is Jewish.

== Career ==
In 1999, Greenfield co-wrote and directed the short film, The Right Hook. Adam Sandler and producers, Todd Garner and Greg Silverman, saw an early cut of the short and gave Greenfield his first opportunity to direct a studio feature called The Animal starring Rob Schneider. It was also Greenfield's first experience to direct a film he didn't write or co-write the screenplay himself.

Immediately after The Animal, Greenfield went back to creating and directing his own material with the coming-of-age film, The Girl Next Door. The film was a breakout surprise for audiences and the studios as well. It was a teen comedy that transformed into a character journey combining comedy with realistic danger and poignant emotional moments.

In 2004, Greenfield created his film and TV production company, WideAwake, Inc., which gave Greenfield his first foray into television. He directed the television pilot, Aliens in America for NBC/Universal Studios and the CW Network.

At New Regency, Greenfield created a few of his passion projects, including the comedy, Role Models, which he produced for Universal Pictures.

Greenfield was then approached by producer Molly Smith to direct the film adaptation of the best-selling novel, Something Borrowed. The film was released by Warner Brothers in May 2011. The film received negative reviews.

Greenfield went back to directing his own material with the action-comedy, Let's Be Cops, a film he co-wrote, directed and produced at 20th Century Fox. Let’s Be Cops opened on August 13, 2014. The film received negative reviews.

== Filmography ==
Short film

Year	Title	Director	Writer
2000	The Right Hook	Yes	Yes

=== Feature film ===
Director

- The Animal (2001)
- The Girl Next Door (2004)
- Something Borrowed (2011)
- Let's Be Cops (2014) (Also producer and writer)
- Half Brothers (2020)
- Playdate (2025)

Producer

- Role Models (2008)

=== Television ===
TV movies

- Go Sick (2002)
- House Broken (2006) (Also producer)
- 52 Fights (2006)
- The Law (2009)

TV series

Year	Title	Notes
2007	Aliens in America	Episodes "Pilot" and "Rocket Club"
2012	The Neighbors	Episodes "Things Just Got Real" and "Merry Crap-Mas"
