= Golden Raspberry Award for Worst Picture =

Award for worst film of the past year

- Awarded for: Worst feature film
- Country: United States
- Presented by: Golden Raspberry Award Foundation
- First award: 1981 (to Can't Stop the Music)
- Currently held by: War of the Worlds (2025)
- Website: www.razzies.com

The Golden Raspberry Award for Worst Picture is a prize at the annual Razzies to the worst film of the past year. Over the 46 ceremonies that have taken place, 237 films have been nominated for Worst Picture, with three ties resulting in 49 winners.

== Winners and nominees ==
Following is a list of nominees and recipients of the Worst Picture prize, including each film's distribution company and producer(s).

=== 1980s ===
Year	Film	Production company(s)	Producer(s)	Ref
1980 (1st)
1980 (1st)	Can't Stop the Music	Associated Film Distribution	Allan Carr	
1980 (1st)	Cruising	Lorimar Productions, United Artists	Jerry Weintraub	
1980 (1st)	The Formula	MGM, United Artists	Steve Shagan	
1980 (1st)	Friday the 13th	Paramount Pictures	Sean S. Cunningham	
1980 (1st)	The Jazz Singer	Associated Film Distribution	Jerry Leider	
1980 (1st)	The Nude Bomb	Universal Studios	Jennings Lang	
1980 (1st)	Raise the Titanic	Associated Film Distribution	William Frye	
1980 (1st)	Saturn 3	Associated Film Distribution	Stanley Donen	
1980 (1st)	Windows	United Artists	Mike Lobell	
1980 (1st)	Xanadu	Universal Studios	Lawrence Gordon	
1981 (2nd)
1981 (2nd)	Mommie Dearest	Paramount Pictures	Frank Yablans	
1981 (2nd)	Endless Love	Universal Studios, PolyGram	Dyson Lovell	
1981 (2nd)	Heaven's Gate	United Artists	Joann Carelli	
1981 (2nd)	The Legend of the Lone Ranger	Universal Studios, Associated Film Distribution	Walter Coblenz	
1981 (2nd)	Tarzan, the Ape Man	MGM, United Artists	Bo Derek	
1982 (3rd)
1982 (3rd)	Inchon	MGM	Mitsuharu Ishii	
1982 (3rd)	Annie	Columbia Pictures	Ray Stark	
1982 (3rd)	Butterfly	Analysis Film Releasing	Matt Cimber	
1982 (3rd)	Megaforce	20th Century Fox	Albert S. Ruddy	
1982 (3rd)	The Pirate Movie	20th Century Fox	David Joseph	
1983 (4th)
1983 (4th)	The Lonely Lady	Universal Studios	Robert R. Weston	
1983 (4th)	Hercules	MGM, United Artists, Cannon Films	Yoram Globus, Menahem Golan	
1983 (4th)	Jaws 3-D	Universal Studios	Rupert Hitzig	
1983 (4th)	Stroker Ace	Warner Bros., Universal Studios	Hank Moonjean	
1983 (4th)	Two of a Kind	20th Century Fox	Roger M. Rothstein, Joe Wizan	
1984 (5th)
1984 (5th)	Bolero	Cannon Films	Bo Derek	
1984 (5th)	Cannonball Run II	Warner Bros.	Albert S. Ruddy	
1984 (5th)	Rhinestone	20th Century Fox	Marvin Worth, Howard Smith	
1984 (5th)	Sheena	Columbia Pictures	Paul Aratow	
1984 (5th)	Where the Boys Are '84	TriStar Pictures	Allan Carr	
1985 (6th)
1985 (6th)	Rambo: First Blood Part II	TriStar Pictures, Carolco Pictures	Buzz Feitshans	
1985 (6th)	Fever Pitch	MGM, United Artists	Freddie Fields	
1985 (6th)	Revolution	Warner Bros.	Irwin Winkler	
1985 (6th)	Rocky IV	MGM, United Artists	Irwin Winkler, Robert Chartoff	
1985 (6th)	Year of the Dragon	MGM, United Artists	Dino De Laurentiis	
1986 (7th)
1986 (7th)	Howard the Duck	Universal Studios	Gloria Katz	
1986 (7th)	Under the Cherry Moon	Warner Bros.	Bob Cavallo, Joe Ruffalo, Steve Fargnoli	
1986 (7th)	Blue City	Paramount Pictures	William L. Hayward, Walter Hill	
1986 (7th)	Cobra	Warner Bros., Cannon Films	Yoram Globus, Menahem Golan	
1986 (7th)	Shanghai Surprise	MGM	John Kohn	
1987 (8th)
1987 (8th)	Leonard Part 6	Columbia Pictures	Bill Cosby	
1987 (8th)	Ishtar	Columbia Pictures	Warren Beatty	
1987 (8th)	Jaws: The Revenge	Universal Studios	Joseph Sargent	
1987 (8th)	Tough Guys Don't Dance	Cannon Films	Yoram Globus, Menahem Golan	
1987 (8th)	Who's That Girl	Warner Bros.	Rosilyn Heller, Bernard Williams	
1988 (9th)
1988 (9th)	Cocktail	Touchstone Pictures	Ted Field, Robert W. Cort	
1988 (9th)	Caddyshack II	Warner Bros.	Neil Canton, Jon Peters, Peter Guber	
1988 (9th)	Hot to Trot	Warner Bros.	Steve Tisch	
1988 (9th)	Mac and Me	Orion Pictures	R. J. Louis	
1988 (9th)	Rambo III	TriStar Pictures, Carolco Pictures	Buzz Feitshans	
1989 (10th)
1989 (10th)	Star Trek V: The Final Frontier	Paramount Pictures	Harve Bennett	
1989 (10th)	The Karate Kid Part III	Columbia Pictures	Jerry Weintraub	
1989 (10th)	Lock Up	TriStar Pictures, Carolco Pictures	Charles Gordon, Lawrence Gordon	
1989 (10th)	Road House	United Artists	Joel Silver	
1989 (10th)	Speed Zone	Orion Pictures	Murray Shostack	

=== 1990s ===
Year	Film	Production company(s)	Producer(s)	Ref
1990 (11th)
1990 (11th)	The Adventures of Ford Fairlane	20th Century Fox	Steven Perry, Joel Silver	
1990 (11th)	Ghosts Can't Do It	Triumph Releasing	Bo Derek	
1990 (11th)	The Bonfire of the Vanities	Warner Bros.	Brian De Palma	
1990 (11th)	Graffiti Bridge	Warner Bros.	Randy Phillips, Craig Rice	
1990 (11th)	Rocky V	United Artists	Irwin Winkler, Robert Chartoff	
1991 (12th)
1991 (12th)	Hudson Hawk	TriStar Pictures	Joel Silver	
1991 (12th)	Cool as Ice	Universal Studios	Carolyn Pfeiffer, Lionel Wigram	
1991 (12th)	Dice Rules	Seven Arts Productions	Loucas George	
1991 (12th)	Nothing but Trouble	Warner Bros.	Lester Berman, Robert K. Weiss	
1991 (12th)	Return to the Blue Lagoon	Columbia Pictures	William Graham	
1992 (13th)
1992 (13th)	Shining Through	20th Century Fox	Carol Baum, Howard Rosenman	
1992 (13th)	The Bodyguard	Warner Bros.	Kevin Costner, Lawrence Kasdan, Jim Wilson	
1992 (13th)	Christopher Columbus: The Discovery	Warner Bros.	Alexander Salkind, Ilya Salkind	
1992 (13th)	Final Analysis	Warner Bros.	Paul Junger Witt, Charles Roven, Tony Thomas	
1992 (13th)	Newsies	Walt Disney Pictures	Michael Finnell	
1993 (14th)
1993 (14th)	Indecent Proposal	Paramount Pictures	Sherry Lansing	
1993 (14th)	Body of Evidence	MGM, United Artists	Dino De Laurentiis	
1993 (14th)	Cliffhanger	TriStar Pictures, Carolco Pictures	Renny Harlin, Alan Marshall	
1993 (14th)	Last Action Hero	Columbia Pictures	John McTiernan, Stephen J. Roth	
1993 (14th)	Sliver	Paramount Pictures	Robert Evans	
1994 (15th)
1994 (15th)	Color of Night	Hollywood Pictures	Buzz Feitshans, David Matalon	
1994 (15th)	North	Columbia Pictures, Castle Rock	Rob Reiner, Alan Zweibel	
1994 (15th)	On Deadly Ground	Warner Bros.	A. Kitman Ho, Julius R. Nasso, Steven Seagal	
1994 (15th)	The Specialist	Warner Bros.	Jerry Weintraub	
1994 (15th)	Wyatt Earp	Warner Bros.	Kevin Costner, Lawrence Kasdan, Jim Wilson	
1995 (16th)
1995 (16th)	Showgirls	MGM, United Artists	Charles Evans, Alan Marshall	
1995 (16th)	Congo	Paramount Pictures	Kathleen Kennedy, Sam Mercer	
1995 (16th)	It's Pat	Touchstone Pictures	Charles B. Wessler	
1995 (16th)	The Scarlet Letter	Hollywood Pictures	Roland Joffé, Andrew G. Vajna	
1995 (16th)	Waterworld	Universal Studios	Kevin Costner, John Davis, Charles Gordon, Lawrence Gordon	
1996 (17th)
1996 (17th)	Striptease	Columbia Pictures, Castle Rock	Andrew Bergman, Mike Lobell	
1996 (17th)	Barb Wire	PolyGram, Gramercy Pictures	Todd Moyer, Mike Richardson, Brad Wyman	
1996 (17th)	Ed	Universal Studios	Rosalie Swedlin	
1996 (17th)	The Island of Dr. Moreau	New Line Cinema	Edward R. Pressman	
1996 (17th)	The Stupids	New Line Cinema, Savoy Pictures	Leslie Belzberg	
1997 (18th)
1997 (18th)	The Postman	Warner Bros.	Kevin Costner, Steve Tisch, Jim Wilson	
1997 (18th)	Anaconda	Columbia Pictures	Verna Harrah, Carole Little, Leonard Rabinowitz	
1997 (18th)	Batman & Robin	Warner Bros.	Peter MacGregor-Scott	
1997 (18th)	Fire Down Below	Warner Bros.	Julius R. Nasso, Steven Seagal	
1997 (18th)	Speed 2: Cruise Control	20th Century Fox	Jan de Bont, Steve Perry, Michael Peyser	
1998 (19th)
1998 (19th)	An Alan Smithee Film: Burn Hollywood Burn	Hollywood Pictures	Ben Myron, Joe Eszterhas	
1998 (19th)	Armageddon	Touchstone Pictures	Michael Bay, Jerry Bruckheimer	
1998 (19th)	The Avengers	Warner Bros.	Jerry Weintraub	
1998 (19th)	Godzilla	TriStar Pictures	Roland Emmerich and Dean Devlin	
1998 (19th)	Spice World	Columbia Pictures	Uri Fruchtmann, Mark L. Rosen, Barnaby Thompson	
1999 (20th)
1999 (20th)	Wild Wild West	Warner Bros.	Jon Peters, Barry Sonnenfeld	
1999 (20th)	Big Daddy	Columbia Pictures	Sid Ganis, Jack Giarraputo	
1999 (20th)	The Blair Witch Project	Artisan Entertainment	Robin Cowie, Gregg Hale	
1999 (20th)	The Haunting	DreamWorks	Susan Arthur, Donna Roth, Colin Wilson	
1999 (20th)	Star Wars: Episode I – The Phantom Menace	20th Century Fox	Rick McCallum, George Lucas	

=== 2000s ===
Year	Film	Production company(s)	Producer(s)	Ref
2000 (21st)
2000 (21st)	Battlefield Earth	Warner Bros., Franchise Pictures	Jonathan D. Krane, Elie Samaha, John Travolta	
2000 (21st)	Book of Shadows: Blair Witch 2	Artisan Entertainment	Bill Carraro	
2000 (21st)	The Flintstones in Viva Rock Vegas	Universal Studios	Bruce Cohen	
2000 (21st)	Little Nicky	New Line Cinema	Jack Giarraputo, Robert Simonds	
2000 (21st)	The Next Best Thing	Paramount Pictures	Leslie Dixon, Linne Radmin, Tom Rosenberg	
2001 (22nd)
2001 (22nd)	Freddy Got Fingered	20th Century Fox	Larry Brezner, Howard Lapides, Lauren Lloyd	
2001 (22nd)	Driven	Warner Bros., Franchise Pictures	Renny Harlin, Elie Samaha, Sylvester Stallone	
2001 (22nd)	Glitter	20th Century Fox, Columbia Pictures	Laurence Mark, E. Bennett Walsh	
2001 (22nd)	Pearl Harbor	Touchstone Pictures	Michael Bay, Jerry Bruckheimer	
2001 (22nd)	3000 Miles to Graceland	Warner Bros., Franchise Pictures	Demian Lichtenstein, Eric Manes, Elie Samaha, Richard Spero, Andrew Stevens	
2002 (23rd)
2002 (23rd)	Swept Away	Screen Gems	Matthew Vaughn	
2002 (23rd)	The Adventures of Pluto Nash	Warner Bros.	Martin Bregman, Michael Scott Bregman, Louis A. Stroller	
2002 (23rd)	Crossroads	Paramount Pictures	Ann Carli	
2002 (23rd)	Pinocchio	Miramax Films	Gianluigi Braschi, Nicoletta Braschi, Elda Ferri	
2002 (23rd)	Star Wars: Episode II – Attack of the Clones	20th Century Fox	Rick McCallum, George Lucas	
2003 (24th)
2003 (24th)	Gigli	Columbia Pictures, Revolution Studios	Martin Brest and Casey Silver	
2003 (24th)	The Cat in the Hat	Universal Studios, DreamWorks	Brian Grazer	
2003 (24th)	Charlie's Angels: Full Throttle	Columbia Pictures	Drew Barrymore, Leonard Goldberg, Nancy Juvonen	
2003 (24th)	From Justin to Kelly	20th Century Fox	John Steven Agoglia	
2003 (24th)	The Real Cancun	New Line Cinema	Mary-Ellis Bunim, Jonathan Murray, Jamie Schutz, Rick de Oliveira	
2004 (25th)
2004 (25th)	Catwoman	Warner Bros.	Denise Di Novi, Edward McDonnell	
2004 (25th)	Alexander	Warner Bros.	Moritz Borman, Jon Kilik, Thomas Schuhly, Iain Smith	
2004 (25th)	Superbabies: Baby Geniuses 2	Triumph Films	Steven Paul	
2004 (25th)	Surviving Christmas	DreamWorks	Betty Thomas, Jenno Topping	
2004 (25th)	White Chicks	Columbia Pictures, Revolution Studios	Rick Alvarez, Lee Mays, Keenen Ivory Wayans, Marlon Wayans, Shawn Wayans	
2005 (26th)
2005 (26th)	Dirty Love	First Look Pictures	John Asher, BJ Davis, Rod Hamilton, Kimberley Kates, Michael Manasseri, Jenny McCarthy, Trent Walford	
2005 (26th)	Deuce Bigalow: European Gigolo	Columbia Pictures	Adam Sandler, Rob Schneider	
2005 (26th)	The Dukes of Hazzard	Warner Bros., Village Roadshow	Bill Gerber	
2005 (26th)	House of Wax	Warner Bros., Village Roadshow	Susan Levin, Joel Silver, Robert Zemeckis	
2005 (26th)	Son of the Mask	New Line Cinema	Erica Huggins, Scott Kroopf	
2006 (27th)
2006 (27th)	Basic Instinct 2	MGM, C2 Pictures	Mario Kassar, Joel B. Michaels, Andrew G. Vajna	
2006 (27th)	BloodRayne	Romar Entertainment	Uwe Boll, Dan Clarke, Wolfgang Herrold	
2006 (27th)	Lady in the Water	Warner Bros./Legendary	Sam Mercer, Jose L. Rodriguez, M. Night Shyamalan	
2006 (27th)	Little Man	Columbia Pictures, Revolution Studios	Rick Alvarez, Lee Mays, Marlon Wayans, Shawn Wayans	
2006 (27th)	The Wicker Man	Warner Bros.	Nicolas Cage, Randall Emmett, Norm Golightly, Avi Lerner, Joanne Sellar	
2007 (28th)
2007 (28th)	I Know Who Killed Me	TriStar Pictures	David Grace, Frank Mancuso Jr.	
2007 (28th)	Bratz	Lionsgate	Avi Arad, Isaac Larian, Steven Paul	
2007 (28th)	Daddy Day Camp	TriStar Pictures, Revolution Studios	William Sherak, Jason Shuman	
2007 (28th)	I Now Pronounce You Chuck & Larry	Universal Studios	Adam Sandler, Tom Shadyac	
2007 (28th)	Norbit	DreamWorks	John Davis, Eddie Murphy, Michael Tollin	
2008 (29th)
2008 (29th)	The Love Guru	Paramount Pictures	Gary Barber, Michael De Luca, Mike Myers	
2008 (29th)	Disaster Movie and Meet the Spartans	Lionsgate, 20th Century Fox	Jason Friedberg, Peter Safran, Aaron Seltzer	
2008 (29th)	The Happening	20th Century Fox	Barry Mendel, Sam Mercer, M. Night Shyamalan	
2008 (29th)	The Hottie & the Nottie	Regent Releasing, Paris Hilton Entertainment	Hadeel Reda	
2008 (29th)	In the Name of the King	Boll KG, Brightlight Pictures	Uwe Boll, Dan Clarke, Wolfgang Herrold, Shawn Williamson	
2009 (30th)
2009 (30th)	Transformers: Revenge of the Fallen	Paramount, DreamWorks, Hasbro	Lorenzo di Bonaventura, Ian Bryce, Tom DeSanto, Don Murphy	
2009 (30th)	All About Steve	20th Century Fox	Sandra Bullock. Mary McLaglen	
2009 (30th)	G.I. Joe: The Rise of Cobra	Paramount Pictures, Hasbro	Lorenzo di Bonaventura, Bob Ducsay, Brian Goldner	
2009 (30th)	Land of the Lost	Universal Studios	Sid and Marty Krofft, Jimmy Miller	
2009 (30th)	Old Dogs	Walt Disney Pictures	Peter Abrams, Robert Levy, Andrew Panay	

=== 2010s ===
Year	Film	Production company(s)	Producer(s)	Ref.
2010 (31st)
2010 (31st)	The Last Airbender	Paramount Pictures, Nickelodeon Movies	Frank Marshall, Sam Mercer and M. Night Shyamalan	
2010 (31st)	The Bounty Hunter	Columbia Pictures	Neal H. Moritz	
2010 (31st)	Sex and the City 2	New Line Cinema, HBO Films, Village Roadshow Pictures	Michael Patrick King, John Melfi, Sarah Jessica Parker and Darren Star	
2010 (31st)	The Twilight Saga: Eclipse	Summit Entertainment	Wyck Godfrey and Karen Rosenfelt	
2010 (31st)	Vampires Suck	20th Century Fox	Jason Friedberg, Peter Safran and Aaron Seltzer	
2011 (32nd)
2011 (32nd)	Jack and Jill	Columbia Pictures	Todd Garner, Jack Giarraputo and Adam Sandler	
2011 (32nd)	Bucky Larson: Born to Be a Star	Columbia Pictures	Barry Bernardi, Allen Covert, David Dorfman and Jack Giarraputo	
2011 (32nd)	New Year's Eve	Warner Bros., New Line Cinema	Mike Karz, Garry Marshall and Wayne Allan Rice	
2011 (32nd)	Transformers: Dark of the Moon	Paramount Pictures	Lorenzo di Bonaventura, Ian Bryce, Tom DeSanto and Don Murphy	
2011 (32nd)	The Twilight Saga: Breaking Dawn – Part 1	Summit Entertainment	Wyck Godfrey, Stephenie Meyer, Karen Rosenfelt	
2012 (33rd)
2012 (33rd)	The Twilight Saga: Breaking Dawn – Part 2	Summit Entertainment	Wyck Godfrey, Stephenie Meyer, Karen Rosenfelt	
2012 (33rd)	Battleship	Universal Pictures	Sarah Aubrey, Peter Berg, Brian Goldner, Duncan Henderson, Bennett Schneir, Scott Stuber	
2012 (33rd)	The Oogieloves in the Big Balloon Adventure	Lionsgate, Romar Entertainment, Kenn Viselman Presents	Gayle Dickie, Kenn Viselman	
2012 (33rd)	That's My Boy	Columbia Pictures	Allen Covert, Jack Giarraputo, Heather Parry, Adam Sandler	
2012 (33rd)	A Thousand Words	Paramount Pictures, DreamWorks	Nicolas Cage, Alain Chabat, Stephanie Danan, Norman Golightly, Brian Robbins, Sharla Sumpter Bridgett	
2013 (34th)
2013 (34th)	Movie 43	Relativity Media	Peter Farrelly, Ryan Kavanaugh, John Penotti, Charles B. Wessler	
2013 (34th)	After Earth	Columbia Pictures	James Lassiter, Caleeb Pinkett, Jada Pinkett Smith, M. Night Shyamalan, Will Smith	
2013 (34th)	Grown Ups 2	Columbia Pictures	Jack Giarraputo, Adam Sandler	
2013 (34th)	The Lone Ranger	Walt Disney Pictures	Jerry Bruckheimer, Gore Verbinski	
2013 (34th)	A Madea Christmas	Lionsgate	Ozzie Areu, Matt Moore, Tyler Perry	
2014 (35th)
2014 (35th)	Saving Christmas	Samuel Goldwyn Films	Darren Doane, Raphi Henley, Amanda Rosser, David Shannon	
2014 (35th)	Left Behind	Freestyle Releasing, Entertainment One	Michael Walker, Paul LaLonde	
2014 (35th)	The Legend of Hercules	Summit Entertainment	Boaz Davidson, Renny Harlin, Danny Lerner, Les Weldon	
2014 (35th)	Teenage Mutant Ninja Turtles	Paramount Pictures, Nickelodeon Movies, Platinum Dunes	Michael Bay, Ian Bryce, Andrew Form, Bradley Fuller, Scott Mednick and Galen Walker	
2014 (35th)	Transformers: Age of Extinction	Paramount Pictures	Lorenzo di Bonaventura, Ian Bryce, Tom DeSanto and Don Murphy	
2015 (36th)
2015 (36th)	Fantastic Four	20th Century Fox	Simon Kinberg, Matthew Vaughn, Hutch Parker, Robert Kulzer and Gregory Goodman	
2015 (36th)	Fifty Shades of Grey	Universal Pictures, Focus Features	Michael De Luca, Dana Brunetti, E. L. James	
2015 (36th)	Jupiter Ascending	Warner Bros.	Grant Hill and The Wachowskis	
2015 (36th)	Paul Blart: Mall Cop 2	Columbia Pictures	Todd Garner, Kevin James, Adam Sandler	
2015 (36th)	Pixels	Columbia Pictures	Adam Sandler, Chris Columbus, Mark Radcliffe, Allen Covert	
2016 (37th)
2016 (37th)	Hillary's America: The Secret History of the Democratic Party	Quality Flix	Gerald R. Molen	
2016 (37th)	Batman v Superman: Dawn of Justice	Warner Bros.	Charles Roven, Deborah Snyder	
2016 (37th)	Dirty Grandpa	Lionsgate	Bill Block, Michael Simkin, Jason Barrett, Barry Josephson	
2016 (37th)	Gods of Egypt	Summit Entertainment	Basil Iwanyk, Alex Proyas	
2016 (37th)	Independence Day: Resurgence	20th Century Fox	Dean Devlin, Harald Kloser, Roland Emmerich	
2016 (37th)	Zoolander 2	Paramount Pictures	Stuart Cornfeld, Scott Rudin, Ben Stiller, Clayton Townsend	
2017 (38th)
2017 (38th)	The Emoji Movie	Columbia Pictures	Michelle Raimo Kouyate	
2017 (38th)	Baywatch	Paramount Pictures	Ivan Reitman, Michael Berk, Douglas Schwartz, Gregory J. Bonann, Beau Flynn	
2017 (38th)	Fifty Shades Darker	Universal Pictures	Michael De Luca, E. L. James, Dana Brunetti, Marcus Viscidi	
2017 (38th)	The Mummy	Universal Pictures	Alex Kurtzman, Chris Morgan, Sean Daniel, Sarah Bradshaw	
2017 (38th)	Transformers: The Last Knight	Paramount Pictures	Don Murphy, Tom DeSanto, Lorenzo di Bonaventura, Ian Bryce	
2018 (39th)
2018 (39th)	Holmes & Watson	Columbia Pictures	Will Ferrell, Adam McKay, Jimmy Miller, Clayton Townsend	
2018 (39th)	Gotti	Vertical Entertainment	Randall Emmett, Marc Fiore, Michael Froch, George Furla	
2018 (39th)	The Happytime Murders	STX Entertainment	Ben Falcone, Jeffrey Hayes, Brian Henson, Melissa McCarthy	
2018 (39th)	Robin Hood	Summit Entertainment	Jennifer Davisson, Leonardo DiCaprio	
2018 (39th)	Winchester	Lionsgate	Tim McGahan, Brett Tomberlin	
2019 (40th)
2019 (40th)	Cats	Universal Pictures	Debra Hayward, Tim Bevan, Eric Fellner, Tom Hooper	
2019 (40th)	The Fanatic	Quiver Distribution	Bill Kenwright	
2019 (40th)	The Haunting of Sharon Tate	Saban Films	Lucas Jarach, Daniel Farrands, Eric Brenner	
2019 (40th)	A Madea Family Funeral	Lionsgate	Tyler Perry, Ozzie Areu, Will Areu, Mark E. Swinton	
2019 (40th)	Rambo: Last Blood	Lionsgate	Avi Lerner, Kevin King Templeton, Yariv Lerner, Les Weldon	

=== 2020s ===
Year	Film	Production company(s)	Producer(s)	Ref
2020 (41st)
2020 (41st)	Absolute Proof	One America News Network	Mary Fanning, Brannon Howse, Mike Lindell	
2020 (41st)	Dolittle	Universal Pictures	Susan Downey, Jeff Kirschenbaum, Joe Roth	
2020 (41st)	Fantasy Island	Columbia Pictures	Jason Blum, Marc Toberoff, Jeff Wadlow	
2020 (41st)	Music	Vertical Entertainment, Landay Entertainment	Vincent Landay, Sia	
2020 (41st)	365 Days	Ekipa	Maciej Kawulski, Ewa Lewandowska, Tomasz Mandes	
2021 (42nd)
2021 (42nd)	Diana the Musical	Netflix	David Bryan, Joe DiPietro, Frank Marshall	
2021 (42nd)	Infinite	Paramount+, Paramount Pictures	Lorenzo di Bonaventura, Mark Huffam, Stephen Levinson, Mark Vahradian, Mark Wahlberg, John Zaozirny	
2021 (42nd)	Karen	Quiver Distribution	Mary Aloe, Sevier Crespo, Coke Daniels, Cory Hardrict, Taryn Manning	
2021 (42nd)	Space Jam: A New Legacy	Warner Bros. Pictures	Maverick Carter, Ryan Coogler, Duncan Henderson, LeBron James	
2021 (42nd)	The Woman in the Window	Netflix, 20th Century Studios	Eli Bush, Anthony Katagas, Scott Rudin	
2022 (43rd)
2022 (43rd)	Blonde	Netflix	Dede Gardner, Jeremy Kleiner, Brad Pitt	
2022 (43rd)	Disney's Pinocchio	Disney+, Walt Disney Pictures	Derek Hogue, Andrew Milano, Chris Weitz, Robert Zemeckis	
2022 (43rd)	Good Mourning	Open Road Films	Chris Long, Machine Gun Kelly, Jib Polhemus, Mod Sun	
2022 (43rd)	The King's Daughter	Gravitas Ventures	David Brookwell, Paul Currie, Wei Han, James Pang Hong, Sean McNamara	
2022 (43rd)	Morbius	Columbia Pictures	Avi Arad, Lucas Foster, Matt Tolmach	
2023 (44th)
2023 (44th)	Winnie-the-Pooh: Blood and Honey	Altitude Film Distribution, Jagged Edge Productions	Scott Jeffrey, Rhys Frake-Waterfield	
2023 (44th)	The Exorcist: Believer	Universal Pictures	Jason Blum, David C. Robinson, James G. Robinson	
2023 (44th)	Expend4bles	Lionsgate Films	Kevin King-Templeton, Les Weldon, Yariv Lerner, Jason Statham	
2023 (44th)	Meg 2: The Trench	Warner Bros. Pictures	Lorenzo di Bonaventura, Belle Avery	
2023 (44th)	Shazam! Fury of the Gods	New Line Cinema, Warner Bros. Pictures	Peter Safran	
2024 (45th)
2024 (45th)	Madame Web	Columbia Pictures	Lorenzo di Bonaventura	
2024 (45th)	Borderlands	Lionsgate Films	Ari Arad, Avi Arad, Erik Feig	
2024 (45th)	Joker: Folie à Deux	Warner Bros. Pictures	Joseph Garner, Emma Tillinger Koskoff, Todd Phillips	
2024 (45th)	Megalopolis	Lionsgate Films	Barry Hirsch, Fred Roos, Michael Bederman, Francis Ford Coppola	
2024 (45th)	Reagan	ShowBiz Direct	Mark Joseph	
2025 (46th)
2025 (46th)	War of the Worlds	Amazon Prime Video	Timur Bekmambetov, Patrick Aiello	
2025 (46th)	The Electric State	Netflix	Russell Ackerman, Chris Castaldi, Mike Larocca, Patrick Newall, Anthony Russo, Joe Russo	
2025 (46th)	Hurry Up Tomorrow	Lionsgate Films	Abel Tesfaye, Reza Fahim, Kevin Turen, Harrison Kreiss	
2025 (46th)	Snow White	Walt Disney Pictures	Marc Platt, Jared LeBoff	
2025 (46th)	Star Trek: Section 31	Paramount+	Ted Miller	

== Studios with multiple nominations and awards ==
Studios with multiple nominations and awards
Nominations	Wins	Distributor
1	0	Legendary
1	1	Altitude Film Distribution
1	1	Amazon Prime Video
1	0	Analysis Film Distribution
2	0	Artisan Entertainment
4	1	Associated Film Distribution
2	0	Boll KG
2	0	Brightlight Pictures
1	1	C2 Pictures
4	1	Cannon Films
4	1	Carolco Pictures
2	1	Castle Rock Entertainment
29	7	Columbia Pictures
1	0	Disney+
6	1	DreamWorks
1	0	Ekipa
1	0	Entertainment One
1	1	First Look Pictures
1	1	Focus Features
1	0	Freestyle Releasing
1	0	Gramercy Pictures
1	0	Gravitas Ventures
1	0	HBO Films
3	2	Hollywood Pictures
1	0	Landay Entertainment
11	0	Lionsgate Films
1	0	Lorimar Productions
11	3	Metro-Goldwyn-Mayer
1	0	Miramax Films
4	2	Netflix
7	0	New Line Cinema
2	1	Nickelodeon Movies
1	1	One America News Network
1	0	Open Road Films
2	0	Orion Pictures
21	6	Paramount Pictures
2	0	Paramount+
1	0	Paris Hilton Entertainment
1	0	Platinum Dunes
2	0	PolyGram Filmed Entertainment
1	1	Quality Flix
2	0	Quiver Distribution
1	0	Regent Releasing
4	1	Revolution Studios
2	0	Romar Entertainment
1	0	Saban Films
1	0	Savoy Pictures
1	1	Screen Gems
1	0	Seven Arts Productions
1	0	STX Entertainment
6	1	Summit Entertainment
1	0	Skydance Media
4	1	Touchstone Pictures
9	3	TriStar Pictures
2	1	Triumph Releasing
19	4	20th Century Studios (formerly 20th Century Fox)
13	1	United Artists
22	4	Universal Pictures
2	0	Vertical Entertainment
2	0	Village Roadshow Pictures
5	0	Walt Disney Pictures
38	5	Warner Bros.

== Individuals with multiple wins ==
2 wins

- Lorenzo di Bonaventura
- Michael De Luca
- Bo Derek
- Buzz Feitshans
- Frank Marshall
- Joel Silver
- Matthew Vaughn

== Individuals with multiple nominations ==
8 nominations

- Lorenzo di Bonaventura

7 nominations

- Adam Sandler

6 nominations

- Jack Giarraputo

5 nominations

- Ian Bryce

4 nominations

- Kevin Costner
- Tom DeSanto
- Don Murphy
- Joel Silver
- Jerry Weintraub

3 nominations

- Avi Arad
- Michael Bay
- Jerry Bruckheimer
- Allen Covert
- Michael De Luca
- Bo Derek
- Buzz Feitshans
- Yoram Globus
- Wyck Godfrey
- Menahem Golan
- Lawrence Gordon
- Renny Harlin
- Karen Rosenfelt
- Peter Safran
- Elie Samaha
- Les Weldon
- Jim Wilson
- Irwin Winkler

2 nominations

- Rick Alvarez
- Ozzie Areu
- Jason Blum
- Uwe Boll
- Dana Brunetti
- Nicolas Cage
- Allan Carr
- Robert Chartoff
- Dan Clarke
- John Davis
- Dino De Laurentiis
- Dean Devlin
- Susan Downey
- Roland Emmerich
- Randall Emmett
- Jason Friedberg
- Todd Garner
- Brian Goldner
- Charles Gordon
- Duncan Henderson
- Wolfgang Herrold
- E. L. James
- Lawrence Kasdan
- Kathleen Kennedy
- Kevin King-Templeton
- Avi Lerner
- Yariv Lerner
- Mike Lobell
- George Lucas
- Alan Marshall
- Frank Marshall
- Lee Mays
- Rick McCallum
- Sam Mercer
- Stephenie Meyer
- Jimmy Miller
- Julius R. Nasso
- Steven Paul
- Jon Peters
- Charles Roven
- Albert S. Ruddy
- Scott Rudin
- Steven Seagal
- Aaron Seltzer
- M. Night Shyamalan
- Steve Tisch
- Clayton Townsend
- Matthew Vaughn
- Andrew G. Vajna
- Marlon Wayans
- Shawn Wayans
- Charles B. Wessler
- Robert Zemeckis

== Franchises ==
=== Multiple nominations ===
4 nominations

- Batman
- Transformers

3 nominations

- Rambo
- The Twilight Saga

2 nominations

- Blair Witch
- DC Extended Universe
- Fifty Shades
- Hercules
- Jaws
- Lone Ranger
- Madea
- Rocky
- Spider-Man
- Star Trek
- Star Wars
