= Golden Raspberry Award for Worst Remake, Rip-off or Sequel =

Annual media award

- Awarded for: Worst in film
- Country: United States
- Presented by: Golden Raspberry Award Foundation
- First award: 1994
- Website: Razzies.com (Archived copy)

The Razzie Award for Worst Remake, Rip-off or Sequel is an award presented at the annual Golden Raspberry Awards for the worst film adapted from some forms of original or previous material (derivative work). This category covers films that are sequels, prequels, remakes, reboots, spin-offs, film adaptations of other media franchises, mockbusters and "rip-offs" (thus making the award open to nearly any high concept film with a superficial resemblance to any other work of fiction).

The following is a list of nominees and recipients of that award, including each film's distribution company.

== History ==
From 1994 to 2005, the category was first titled Worst Remake or Sequel. The category was divided into Worst Prequel or Sequel and Worst Remake or Rip-off in 2006 and 2007. The categories were again merged in 2008 to form Worst Prequel, Remake, Rip-off or Sequel, and it was shortened to the present title since 2012. The award was not presented in 1996 and 1999.

== Criteria ==
Despite not being mentioned in the name of the award, film adaptations of other media (books, graphic novels, cartoons, etc.) are eligible for nomination (extending the term "remake" broadly to include adaptations).

Razzie nominations have also stretched the definition on occasion; for example, Jack & Jill was described as a "Remake/Ripoff of Glen or Glenda" despite bearing no resemblance beyond that they both feature male actors portraying both male and female characters; this was widely viewed as an excuse to nominate the film in every category. Similarly, Karen was described as an "Inadvertent Remake of Cruella" despite the lack of any real similarity between the two films, and The Meg was listed as a rip-off of Jaws despite both films having little in common beyond having a giant shark as villain.

== Worst Remake or Sequel (1994–2005) ==
- 1994 – Wyatt Earp (remake of Tombstone) – Warner Bros. – Kevin Costner / Lawrence Kasdan / Jim Wilson
  - Beverly Hills Cop III – Paramount – Robert Rehme / Mace Neufeld
  - City Slickers II: The Legend of Curly's Gold – Columbia / Castle Rock Entertainment – Billy Crystal
  - The Flintstones – Universal – Bruce Cohen
  - Love Affair – Warner Bros. – Warren Beatty
- 1995 – The Scarlet Letter – Hollywood – Roland Joffe / Andrew G. Vajna
  - Ace Ventura: When Nature Calls – Warner Bros. – James G. Robinson
  - Dr. Jekyll and Ms. Hyde – Savoy Pictures – Robert Shapiro / Jerry Leider
  - Showgirls (remake of both All About Eve and The Lonely Lady) – MGM / UA – Charles Evans / Alan Marshall
  - Village of the Damned – Universal – Michael Preger / Sandy King
- 1997 – Speed 2: Cruise Control – 20th Century Fox – Jan de Bont / Steve Perry / Michael Peyser
  - Batman & Robin – Warner Bros. – Peter MacGregor-Scott
  - Home Alone 3 – 20th Century Fox – John Hughes / Hilton Green
  - The Lost World: Jurassic Park – Universal – Kathleen Kennedy / Gerald R. Molen / Colin Wilson
  - McHale's Navy – Universal – Bill Sheinberg / Jonathan Sheinberg / Sid Sheinberg
- 1998 – The Avengers – Warner Bros. – Jerry Weintraub (tie)
- 1998 – Godzilla – TriStar – Dean Devlin / Roland Emmerich (tie)
- 1998 – Psycho – Universal – Brian Grazer / Gus Van Sant (tie)
  - Lost in Space – New Line Cinema – Mark W. Koch / Stephen Hopkins / Akiva Goldsman / Carla Fry
  - Meet Joe Black (remake of Death Takes a Holiday) – Universal – Martin Brest
- 2000 – Book of Shadows: Blair Witch 2 – Artisan – Bill Carraro
  - The Flintstones in Viva Rock Vegas – Universal – Bruce Cohen
  - Get Carter – Warner Bros. – Neil Canton / Mark Canton / Elie Samaha
  - How the Grinch Stole Christmas – Universal – Brian Grazer
  - Mission: Impossible 2 – Paramount – Tom Cruise / Paula Wagner
- 2001 – Planet of the Apes – 20th Century Fox – Richard D. Zanuck / Ralph Winter
  - Crocodile Dundee in Los Angeles – Paramount – Paul Hogan / Lance Hool
  - Jurassic Park III – Universal – Kathleen Kennedy / Larry Franco
  - Pearl Harbor (remake of Tora! Tora! Tora!) – Touchstone – Michael Bay / Jerry Bruckheimer
  - Sweet November – Warner Bros. – Elliott Kastner / Steven Reuther / Deborah Aal / Erwin Stoff
- 2002 – Swept Away – Screen Gems – Matthew Vaughn
  - I Spy – Columbia – Mario Kassar / Andrew G. Vajna / Betty Thomas / Jenno Topping
  - Mr. Deeds (remake of Mr. Deeds Goes to Town) – Columbia / New Line Cinema – Sid Ganis / Jack Giarraputo
  - Pinocchio – Miramax – Gianluigi Braschi / Nicoletta Braschi / Elda Ferri
  - Star Wars: Episode II – Attack of the Clones – 20th Century Fox – George Lucas / Rick McCallum
- 2003 – Charlie's Angels: Full Throttle – Columbia – Drew Barrymore / Leonard Goldberg / Nancy Juvonen
  - Dumb and Dumberer: When Harry Met Lloyd – New Line Cinema – Troy Miller / Brad Krevoy / Mark Burg / Oren Koules / Toby Emmerich
  - From Justin to Kelly (remake of both Where the Boys Are and Where the Boys Are '84) – 20th Century Fox – John Steven Agoglia
  - The Texas Chainsaw Massacre – New Line Cinema – Michael Bay / Mike Fleiss / Brad Fuller / Tobe Hooper / Kim Henkel
  - 2 Fast 2 Furious – Universal – Lee Mayes / Neal H. Moritz
- 2004 – Scooby-Doo 2: Monsters Unleashed – Warner Bros. – Charles Roven / Richard Suckle
  - Alien vs. Predator – 20th Century Fox – Walter Hill / Gordon Carroll / David Giler / John Davis
  - Anacondas: The Hunt for the Blood Orchid – Screen Gems – Verna Harrah
  - Around the World in 80 Days – Disney – Bill Badalato / Hal Lieberman
  - Exorcist: The Beginning – Warner Bros. – Aaron Dem / Guy McElwaine / David C. Robinson / James G. Robinson
- 2005 – Son of the Mask – New Line Cinema – Erica Huggins / Scott Kroopf
  - Bewitched – Columbia – Nora Ephron / Lucy Fisher / Penny Marshall / Douglas Wick
  - Deuce Bigalow: European Gigolo – Columbia – Adam Sandler / John Schneider
  - The Dukes of Hazzard – Warner Bros. – Bill Gerber
  - House of Wax – Warner Bros. – Susan Levin / Joel Silver / Robert Zemeckis

== Worst Prequel or Sequel (2006, 2007) ==
- 2006 – Basic Instinct 2 – MGM – Mario Kassar / Joel B. Michaels / Andrew G. Vajna
  - Big Momma's House 2 – 20th Century Fox – Michael Green / David T. Friendly
  - Garfield: A Tail of Two Kitties – 20th Century Fox – John Davis
  - The Santa Clause 3: The Escape Clause – Disney – Tim Allen / Brian Reilly / Jeffrey Silver
  - The Texas Chainsaw Massacre: The Beginning – New Line Cinema – Michael Bay / Mike Fleiss / Tobe Hooper / Kim Henkel / Andrew Form / Brad Fuller
- 2007 – Daddy Day Camp – TriStar / Revolution Studios – William Sherak / Jason Shuman
  - Aliens vs. Predator: Requiem – 20th Century Fox – John Davis / David Giler / Walter Hill
  - Evan Almighty – Universal – Gary Barber / Roger Birnbaum / Michael Bostick / Neal H. Moritz / Tom Shadyac
  - Hannibal Rising – The Weinstein Company – Dino De Laurentiis / Martha De Laurentiis / Tarak Ben Ammar
  - Hostel: Part II – Lions Gate – Mike Fleiss / Eli Roth / Chris Briggs

== Worst Remake or Rip-off (2006, 2007) ==
- 2006 – Little Man (rip-off of the 1954 Bugs Bunny cartoon Baby Buggy Bunny) – Columbia / Revolution Studios – Rick Alvares / Lee Mays / Marlon Wayans / Shawn Wayans
  - The Pink Panther – Columbia – Robert Simonds
  - Poseidon – Warner Bros. – Wolfgang Petersen / Duncan Henderson / Mike Fleiss / Akiva Goldsman
  - The Shaggy Dog – Disney – David Hoberman / Tim Allen
  - The Wicker Man – Warner Bros. – Nicolas Cage / Randall Emmett / Norm Golightly / Avi Lerner / Joanne Sellar
- 2007 – I Know Who Killed Me (rip-off of Hostel, Saw and The Patty Duke Show) – TriStar – David Grace / Frank Mancuso Jr.
  - Are We Done Yet? (sequel to Are We There Yet?, remake of Mr. Blandings Builds His Dream House) – Columbia / Revolution Studios – Ted Hartley / Ice Cube / Matt Alvarez / Todd Garner
  - Bratz – Lions Gate – Isaac Larian / Avi Arad / Steven Paul
  - Epic Movie (rip-off of many films) – 20th Century Fox – Paul Schiff
  - Who's Your Caddy? (rip-off of Caddyshack) – MGM / Dimension – Christopher Eberts / Tracy Edmonds / Kia Jam / Arnold Rifkin

== Worst Prequel, Remake, Rip-off or Sequel (2008–2011) ==
- 2008 – Indiana Jones and the Kingdom of the Crystal Skull – Paramount / Lucasfilm – Kathleen Kennedy / Frank Marshall
  - The Day the Earth Stood Still – 20th Century Fox – Erwin Stoff / Paul Harris Boardman / Gregory Goodman
  - Disaster Movie – Lions Gate & Meet the Spartans – 20th Century Fox (jointly) – Jason Friedberg / Peter Safran / Aaron Seltzer
  - Speed Racer – Warner Bros. – Joel Silver / Grant Hill / Lana Wachowski / Lilly Wachowski
  - Star Wars: The Clone Wars – Lucasfilm / Warner Bros. – Catherine Winder
- 2009 – Land of the Lost – Universal – Sid and Marty Krofft / Jimmy Miller
  - G.I. Joe: The Rise of Cobra – Paramount / Hasbro – Lorenzo di Bonaventura / Bob Ducsay / Brian Goldner
  - The Pink Panther 2 – Columbia / Metro-Goldwyn-Mayer – Robert Simonds
  - Transformers: Revenge of the Fallen – DreamWorks / Paramount / Hasbro – Lorenzo di Bonaventura / Ian Bryce / Tom DeSanto / Don Murphy
  - The Twilight Saga: New Moon – Summit Entertainment – Wyck Godfrey / Karen Rosenfelt
- 2010 – Sex and the City 2 – New Line Cinema / Village Roadshow – Michael Patrick King / John Melfi / Sarah Jessica Parker / Darren Star
  - Clash of the Titans – Warner Bros. – Kevin De La Noy / Basil Iwanyk / Richard D. Zanuck
  - The Last Airbender – Paramount / Nickelodeon / Kennedy/Marshall – Frank Marshall / Sam Mercer / M. Night Shyamalan
  - The Twilight Saga: Eclipse – Summit Entertainment – Wyck Godfrey / Karen Rosenfelt
  - Vampires Suck – 20th Century Fox / Regency – Jason Friedberg / Peter Safran / Aaron Seltzer
- 2011 – Jack and Jill (remake/rip-off of Glen or Glenda) – Columbia – Adam Sandler / Jack Giarraputo / Todd Garner
  - Arthur – Warner Bros. – Larry Brezner / Kevin McCormick / Chris Bender / Michael Tadross
  - Bucky Larson: Born to Be a Star (rip-off of Boogie Nights and A Star Is Born) – Columbia – Adam Sandler / Jack Giarraputo / Allen Covert / Nick Swardson / David Dorfman
  - The Hangover Part II – Warner Bros. – Daniel Goldberg / Todd Phillips
  - The Twilight Saga: Breaking Dawn – Part 1 – Summit Entertainment – Wyck Godfrey / Stephenie Meyer / Karen Rosenfelt

== Worst Remake, Rip-off or Sequel (2012–present) ==
- 2012 – The Twilight Saga: Breaking Dawn – Part 2 – Summit Entertainment – Wyck Godfrey / Stephenie Meyer / Karen Rosenfelt
  - Ghost Rider: Spirit of Vengeance – Columbia – Steven Paul / Ashok Amritaj / Michael De Luca / Avi Arad
  - Madea's Witness Protection – Lionsgate – Tyler Perry / Ozzie Areu / Paul Hall
  - Piranha 3DD – Dimension – Mark Canton / Marc Toberoff / Joel Soisson
  - Red Dawn – FilmDistrict – Beau Flynn / Tripp Vinson
- 2013 – The Lone Ranger – Disney – Jerry Bruckheimer / Gore Verbinski
  - Grown Ups 2 – Columbia – Adam Sandler / Jack Giarraputo
  - The Hangover Part III – Warner Bros. – Daniel Goldberg / Todd Phillips
  - Scary Movie 5 – The Weinstein Company – David Zucker / Phil Dornfeld
  - The Smurfs 2 – Columbia – Jordan Kerner
- 2014 – Annie – Columbia – Jay Brown, Will Gluck, Jada Pinkett Smith, Caleeb Pinkett, Tyran Smith, Will Smith, Shawn "Jay-Z" Carter
  - Atlas Shrugged Part III: Who Is John Galt? – Atlas Distribution Company – John Aglialoro, Harmon Kaslow
  - The Legend of Hercules – Summit Entertainment—Boaz Davidson, Renny Harlin, Danny Lerner, Les Weldon
  - Teenage Mutant Ninja Turtles – Paramount, Nickelodeon – Michael Bay, Ian Bryce, Andrew Form, Bradley Fuller, Scott Mednick, Galen Walker
  - Transformers: Age of Extinction – Paramount, Hasbro – Ian Bryce, Tom DeSanto, Lorenzo di Bonaventura, Don Murphy
- 2015 – Fantastic Four – 20th Century Fox – Simon Kinberg, Matthew Vaughn, Hutch Parker, Robert Kulzer, Gregory Goodman
  - Alvin and the Chipmunks: The Road Chip – 20th Century Fox – Janice Karman, Ross Bagdasarian
  - Hot Tub Time Machine 2 – Paramount — Andrew Panay
  - The Human Centipede 3 (Final Sequence) – IFC Midnight—Tom Six, Ilona Six
  - Paul Blart: Mall Cop 2 – Columbia — Todd Garner, Kevin James, Adam Sandler
- 2016 – Batman v Superman: Dawn of Justice – Warner Bros. – Charles Roven, Deborah Snyder
  - Alice Through the Looking Glass – Disney – Joe Roth, Suzanne Todd, Jennifer Todd, Tim Burton
  - Fifty Shades of Black – Open Road Films – Marlon Wayans, Rick Alvares
  - Independence Day: Resurgence – 20th Century Fox – Dean Devlin, Harald Kloser, Roland Emmerich
  - Teenage Mutant Ninja Turtles: Out of the Shadows – Paramount, Nickelodeon – Michael Bay, Andrew Form, Bradley Fuller, Scott Mednick, Galen Walker
  - Zoolander 2 – Paramount – Stuart Cornfield, Scott Rudin, Ben Stiller, Clayton Townsend
- 2017 – Fifty Shades Darker – Universal — Dana Brunetti, Michael De Luca, E.L. James, Marcus Viscidi
  - Baywatch – Paramount — Michael Berk, Beau Flynn, Ivan Reitman, Douglas Schwartz
  - Boo 2! A Madea Halloween – Lionsgate — Tyler Perry, Ozzie Areu, Will Areu, Mark E. Swinton
  - The Mummy – Universal — Sarah Bradshaw, Sean Daniel, Alex Kurtzman, Chris Morgan
  - Transformers: The Last Knight – Paramount — Ian Bryce, Tom DeSanto, Lorenzo di Bonaventura, K.C. Hodenfield, Don Murphy
- 2018 – Holmes & Watson – Columbia – Will Ferrell, Adam McKay, Jimmy Miller, Clayton Townsend
  - Death of a Nation (remake of Hillary's America: The Secret History of the Democratic Party) – Quality Flix – Gerald R. Molen
  - Death Wish – Metro-Goldwyn-Mayer – Roger Birnbaum
  - The Meg (rip-off of Jaws) – Warner Bros. – Lorenzo di Bonaventura, Colin Wilson, Belle Avery
  - Robin Hood – Summit Entertainment – Jennifer Davisson, Leonardo DiCaprio
- 2019 – Rambo: Last Blood – Lionsgate – Avi Lerner, Kevin King Templeton, Yariv Lerner, Les Weldon
  - Dark Phoenix – 20th Century Fox – Simon Kinberg, Hutch Parker, Lauren Shuler Donner, Todd Hallowell
  - Godzilla: King of the Monsters – Warner Bros. – Mary Parent, Alex Garcia, Thomas Tull, Jon Jashni, Brian Rogers
  - Hellboy – Lionsgate – Lawrence Gordon, Lloyd Levin, Mike Richardson, Philip Westgren, Carl Hampe, Matt O'Toole, Les Weldon, Yariv Lerner
  - A Madea Family Funeral – Lionsgate – Ozzie Areu, Will Areu, Mark E. Swinton
- 2020/21 – Dolittle – Universal – Joe Roth, Jeff Kirschenbaum, Susan Downey
  - Fantasy Island - Columbia - Jason Blum, Marc Toberoff, Jeff Wadlow
  - Hubie Halloween (rip-off of Ernest Scared Stupid) - Netflix - Adam Sandler, Kevin Grady, Dominico Hadelo, Allen Covert
  - 365 Days (rip-off of Fifty Shades of Grey) - Next Film - Maciej Kawulski, Ewa Lewandowska, Tomasz Mandes
  - Wonder Woman 1984 - Warner Bros. - Charles Roven, Deborah Snyder, Zack Snyder, Patty Jenkins, Gal Gadot, Stephen Jones
- 2021 – Space Jam: A New Legacy – Warner Bros. – Ryan Coogler, LeBron James, Maverick Carter, Duncan Henderson
  - Karen (inadvertent remake of Cruella) - Quiver Distribution - Taryn Manning, Cory Hardrict, Sevier Crespo, Coke Daniels
  - Tom & Jerry - Warner Bros. - Christopher DeFaria
  - Twist (rap remake of Oliver Twist) - Saban Films, Sky Cinema - Ben Grass, Noel Clarke, Jason Maza, Matt Williams
  - The Woman in the Window (rip-off of Rear Window) - Netflix - Scott Rudin, Eli Bush, Anthony Katagas
- 2022 – Disney's Pinocchio (Disney+) – Andrew Milano, Chris Weitz, Robert Zemeckis, Derek Hogue
  - Blonde (Netflix) (Note: Considered a remake of Blonde, a 2001 TV miniseries.) - Brad Pitt, Dede Gardner, Jeremy Kleiner, Tracey Landon, Scott Robertson
  - Firestarter (Universal) - Jason Blum, Akiva Goldsman
  - Jurassic World Dominion (Universal) - Frank Marshall and Patrick Crowley
  - 365 Days: This Day & The Next 365 Days (Netflix) - Ewa Lewandowska, Tomasz Mandes, Maciej Kawulski
- 2023 – Winnie-the-Pooh: Blood and Honey (Altitude Film Distribution) – Rhys Frake-Waterfield, Scott Chambers
  - Ant-Man and the Wasp: Quantumania (Disney) - Stephen Broussard, Kevin Feige
  - The Exorcist: Believer (Universal) - Jason Blum, David C. Robinson, James G. Robinson
  - Expend4bles (Lionsgate) - Kevin King-Templeton, Les Weldon, Yariv Lerner, Jason Statham
  - Indiana Jones and the Dial of Destiny (Disney) (Note: Referred to as Indiana Jones and the Dial of Still Beating a Dead Horse) - Kathleen Kennedy, Frank Marshall, Simon Emanuel
- 2024 – Joker: Folie à Deux (Warner Bros.) - Joseph Garner, Emma Tillinger Koskoff, Todd Phillips
  - The Crow (Lionsgate) - Edward R. Pressman, Molly Hassell, John Jencks, Victor Hadida, Samuel Hadida
  - Kraven the Hunter (Columbia) - Avi Arad, Matt Tolmach, David Householter
  - Mufasa: The Lion King (Disney) - Adele Romanski, Mark Ceryak
  - Rebel Moon – Part Two: The Scargiver (Netflix) - Deborah Snyder, Eric Newman, Zack Snyder, Wesley Coller
- 2025 - War of the Worlds (Prime Video) - Patrick Aiello, Timur Bekmambetov
  - Five Nights at Freddy's 2 (Universal) - Jason Blum, Scott Cawthon
  - I Know What You Did Last Summer (Sony Pictures Releasing) - Neal H. Moritz
  - Smurfs (Paramount Pictures) - Rihanna, Jay Brown, Ty-Ty Smith, Ryan Harris
  - Snow White (Disney) - Marc Platt, Jared LeBoff

== Franchises/properties ==
=== Most wins ===
As of 2025, the Batman film franchise has the most wins with Batman v Superman: Dawn of Justice (2016) and Joker: Folie à Deux (2024).

=== Most nominations ===
4 nominations

- The Twilight Saga

3 nominations

- Batman
- Jurassic Park
- Madea
- 365 Days
- Transformers

2 nominations

- Alien vs. Predator
- DCEU
- The Exorcist
- Fifty Shades
- The Flintstones
- Godzilla
- The Hangover Trilogy
- Indiana Jones
- The Pink Panther
- Pinocchio
- Smurfs
- Star Wars
- Teenage Mutant Ninja Turtles
- The Texas Chainsaw Massacre
