= 42nd Golden Raspberry Awards =

Award ceremony for worst in film in 2021

- Awarded for: Worst in film
- Date: March 26, 2022
- Site: Los Angeles, California

Highlights
- Worst Picture: Diana: The Musical
- Most awards: Diana: The Musical (5)
- Most nominations: Diana: The Musical (9)

The 42nd Golden Raspberry Awards, or Razzies, was an awards ceremony that identified the worst films in 2021, according to votes from members of the Golden Raspberry Foundation. Razzies co-founder John J. B. Wilson has stated that the intent of the awards is "to be funny."

It took place on March 26, 2022, in its traditional slot on the day before the Oscars. The awards were based on votes from members of the Golden Raspberry Foundation. The nominations were announced on February 7, 2022.

== Winners and nominees ==
The nominees were revealed on February 7, 2022.

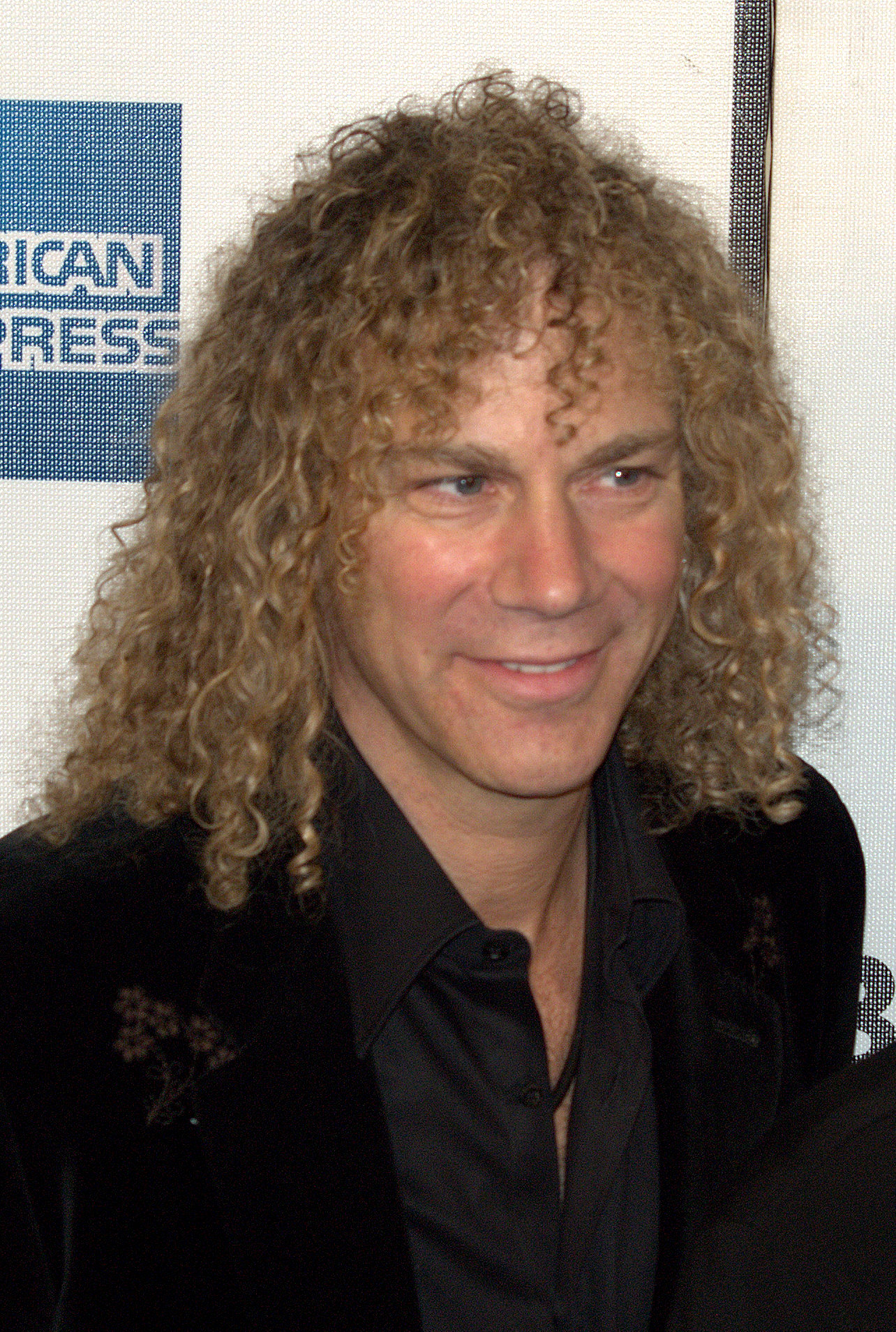
David Bryan, Worst Picture and Worst Screenplay co-winner

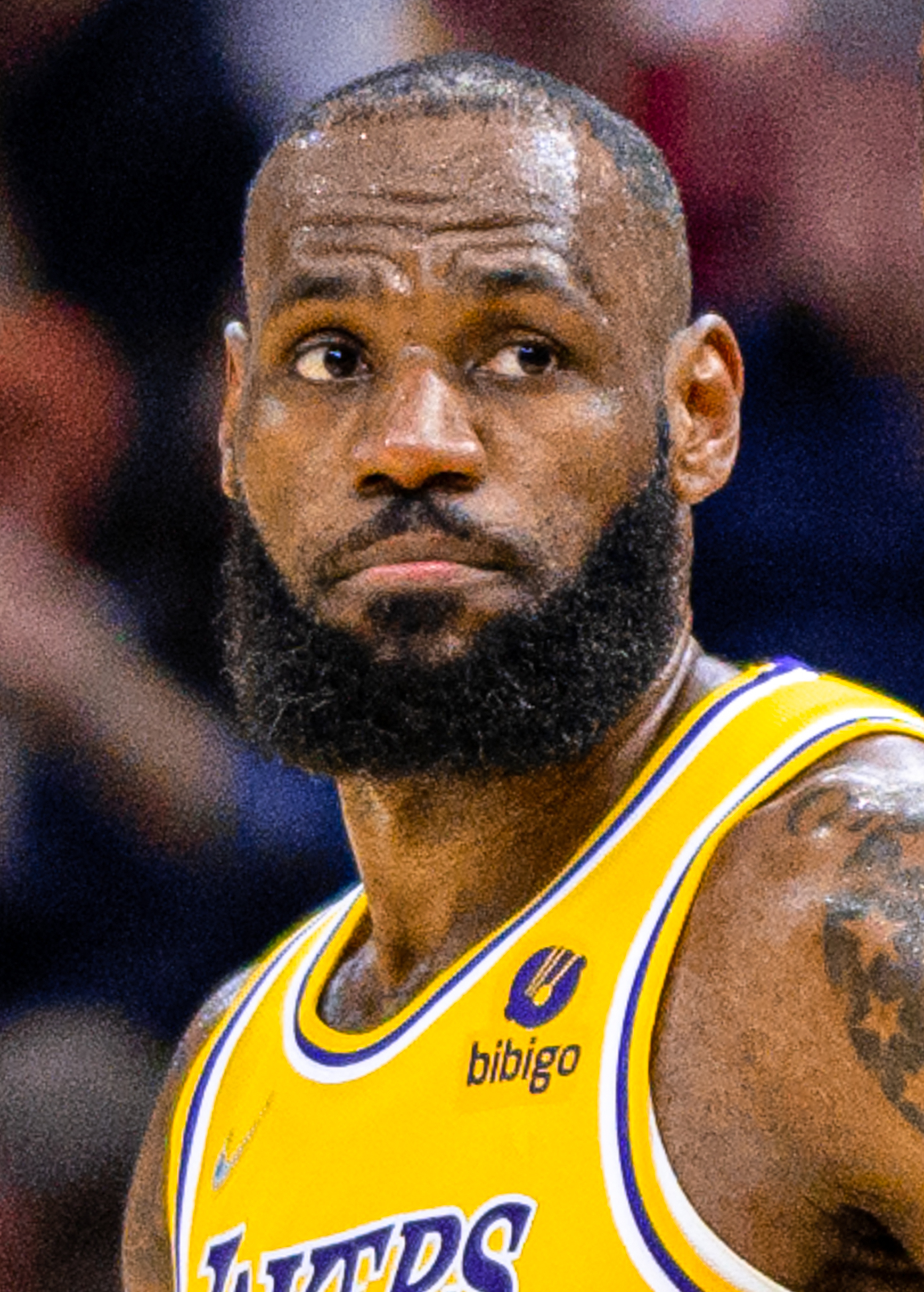
LeBron James, Worst Actor and Worst Screen Combo winner

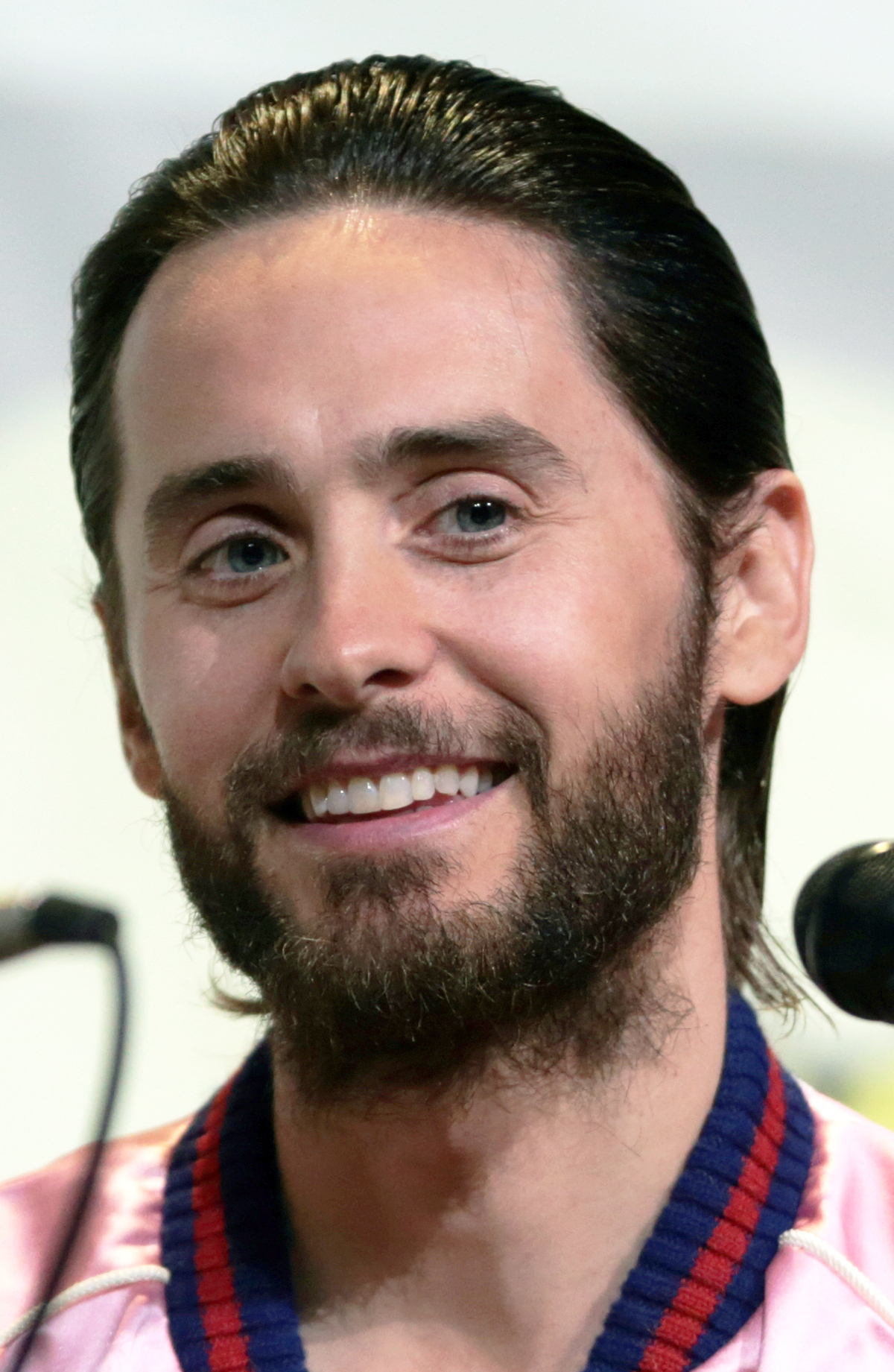
Jared Leto, Worst Supporting Actor winner

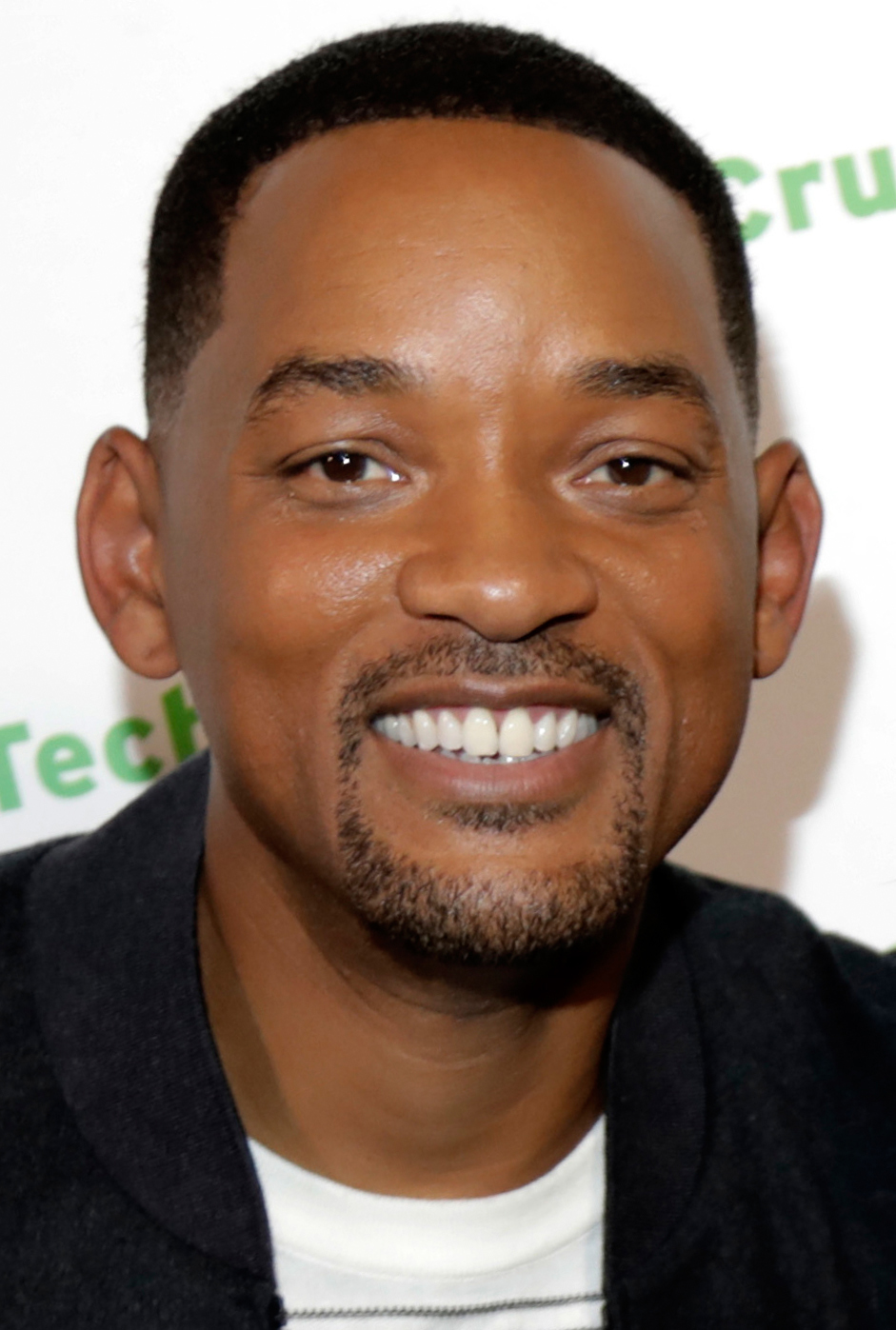
Will Smith, Razzie Redeemer Award winner

Worst Picture: Diana: The Musical (Netflix) – David Bryan, Joe DiPietro, and Frank Marshall; Infinite (Paramount+) – Lorenzo di Bonaventura, Mark Huffam, Stephen Levinson, Mark Vahradian, Mark Wahlberg, and John Zaozirny; Karen (Quiver) – Mary Aloe, Sevier Crespo, "Coke" Daniels, Cory Hardrict, and Taryn Manning; Space Jam: A New Legacy (Warner Bros.) – Maverick Carter, Ryan Coogler, Duncan Henderson, and LeBron James; The Woman in the Window (Netflix) – Eli Bush, Anthony Katagas, and Scott Rudin	Worst Director: Christopher Ashley – Diana: The Musical; Stephen Chbosky – Dear Evan Hansen; Coke Daniels – Karen; Renny Harlin – The Misfits; Joe Wright – The Woman in the Window
Worst Actor: LeBron James – Space Jam: A New Legacy as himself; Scott Eastwood – Dangerous as Dylan "D" Forrester; Roe Hartrampf – Diana: The Musical as Prince Charles; Ben Platt – Dear Evan Hansen as Evan Hansen; Mark Wahlberg – Infinite as Evan McCauley & Heinrich Treadway (2020)	Worst Actress: Jeanna de Waal – Diana: The Musical as Princess Diana; Amy Adams – The Woman in the Window as Dr. Anna Fox; Megan Fox – Midnight in the Switchgrass as Rebecca Lombardi; Taryn Manning – Karen as Karen Drexler; Ruby Rose – Vanquish as Victoria
Worst Supporting Actor: Jared Leto – House of Gucci as Paolo Gucci; Ben Affleck – The Last Duel as Count Pierre d'Alençon; Nick Cannon – The Misfits as Ringo; Mel Gibson – Dangerous as Dr. Alderwood; Gareth Keegan – Diana: The Musical as James Hewitt, the Muscle-Bound Horse Trainer	Worst Supporting Actress: Judy Kaye – Diana: The Musical as BOTH Queen Elizabeth II and Barbara Cartland; Amy Adams – Dear Evan Hansen as Cynthia Murphy; Sophie Cookson – Infinite as Nora Brightman; Erin Davie – Diana: The Musical as Camilla Parker Bowles; Taryn Manning – Every Last One of Them as Maggie
Worst Screen Combo: LeBron James & any Warner cartoon character (or Time-Warner product) he dribbles on – Space Jam: A New Legacy; Any klutzy cast member & any lamely lyricized (or choreographed) musical number – Diana: The Musical; Jared Leto & either his 17-pound latex face, his geeky clothes or his ridiculous accent – House of Gucci; Ben Platt & any other character who acts like Platt singing 24/7 is normal – Dear Evan Hansen; Tom & Jerry (aka Itchy & Scratchy) – Tom & Jerry	Worst Remake, Rip-off or Sequel: Space Jam: A New Legacy (Warner Bros.); Karen (Quiver) (described as an "Inadvertent Remake of Cruella"); Tom & Jerry (Warner Bros.); Twist (Sky Cinema); The Woman in the Window (Netflix) (described as a "Rip-off of Rear Window")
Worst Screenplay: Diana: The Musical – Script by Joe DiPietro; Music and Lyrics by David Bryan and DiPietro; Karen – Written by "Coke" Daniels; The Misfits – Screenplay by Robert Henny and Kurt Wimmer; Screen Story by Henny; Twist – Written by Sally Collett and John Wrathall; Additional Material by Tom Grass, Kevin Lehane, Michael Lindley, and Matthew Parkhill (from an "Original Idea" by David T. Lynch, Keith Lynch, and Simon Thomas); The Woman in the Window – Screenplay by Tracy Letts (from the novel by A. J. Finn)	Razzie Redeemer Award: Will Smith – King Richard; Jamie Dornan – Belfast; Nicolas Cage – Pig
Worst Performance by Bruce Willis in a 2021 Movie (rescinded) (Note: Following Willis' aphasia diagnosis in March 2022, the category and its nominations were rescinded by the Golden Raspberry Foundation. For more information, refer to § Worst Performance by Bruce Willis in a 2021 Movie.): ~~Cosmic Sin as James Ford~~; ~~American Siege as Ben Watts~~; ~~Apex as Thomas Malone / The Prey~~; ~~Deadlock as Ron Whitlock~~; ~~Fortress as Robert Michaels~~; ~~Midnight in the Switchgrass as Karl Helter~~; ~~Out of Death as Jack Harris~~; ~~Survive the Game as David~~

== Films with multiple nominations ==
The following films received multiple nominations:

Films with multiple nominations at the 42nd Golden Raspberry Awards
Nominations	Film
9	Diana: The Musical
5	Karen
5	The Woman in the Window
4	Dear Evan Hansen
4	Space Jam: A New Legacy
3	Infinite
3	The Misfits
2	Dangerous
2	House of Gucci
2	Tom & Jerry
2	Twist

The following films received multiple wins:

Films with multiple wins at the 42nd Golden Raspberry Awards
Wins	Film
5	Diana: The Musical
3	Space Jam: A New Legacy

== Criticism ==
=== Nominations ===
Prior to the ceremony, the Razzies were heavily criticized for overlooking critically panned performances and films, including He's All That and Thunder Force among others, while also nominating mostly unknown films, such as Karen, that also received criticism for its inclusion for Worst Remake, Rip-off or Sequel described as an "Inadvertent Remake of Cruella" despite the lack of any real similarity between the two films. They also received criticism for lacking actual actor couples in the Worst Screen Combo category and its inclusion for performances by Ben Affleck in the critically acclaimed film The Last Duel and Jared Leto in House of Gucci for Worst Supporting Actor; both performances were nominated, with Leto winning the award. Conversely, Leto received nominations for Best Supporting Actor from the Critics Choice Association and Screen Actors Guild. A reviewer for the website The Avocado was particularly critical of Affleck's nomination, stating that he "gave one of the year's best performances" in The Last Duel, writing: "Was it silly? Of course it was and it was perfect for the role." The same reviewer also criticized Leto's nomination, writing that he "doesn't deserve to be on here either" and arguing that he was "perfectly cast as a pathetic little moron that's in over his head" in House of Gucci.

=== Worst Performance by Bruce Willis in a 2021 Movie ===
The Razzie® Awards
(@RazzieAwards)
tweeted:

The Razzies are truly sorry for #BruceWillis diagnosed condition. Perhaps this explains why he wanted to go out with a bang in 2021. Our best wishes to Bruce and family.

March 31, 2022

This year introduced a special category, "Worst Performance by Bruce Willis in a 2021 Movie", which consisted of all eight films Willis appeared in throughout 2021. On March 30, 2022, Willis's family announced he was retiring from acting following an aphasia diagnosis, which resulted in the category incurring criticism as being insensitive. The Razzies originally stood by their decision, tweeting "perhaps this explains why he wanted to go out with a bang in 2021. Our best wishes to Bruce and family". They later rescinded the award in the wake of public backlash, stating "If someone's medical condition is a factor in their decision making and/or their performance, we acknowledge that it is not appropriate to give them a Razzie".
