= 2006 Stinkers Bad Movie Awards =

Award ceremony presented by the Stinkers Bad Movie Awards in 2007

29th Stinkers Bad Movie Awards
- Date: 2007

Highlights
- Worst Film: BloodRayne
- Most awards: BloodRayne and Zoom (4)
- Most nominations: Zoom (10)

The 29th and final Stinkers Bad Movie Awards were released by the Hastings Bad Cinema Society in 2007 to honor the worst films the film industry had to offer in 2006. Zoom received the most nominations with ten. Dishonourable mentions are also featured for Worst Picture (39 total). A few months after the results were released, the Stinkers released their expanded 1981 ballot before shutting down for good.

== Winners and nominees ==
=== Worst Picture ===
Film	Production company(s)
BloodRayne	Romar Entertainment
Basic Instinct 2	Sony/MGM
Lady in the Water	Warner Bros.
Little Man	Sony/Revolution
Zoom	Sony/Revolution

==== Dishonourable Mentions ====
- American Dreamz (Universal)
- An American Haunting (Freestyle)
- Babel (Paramount)
- Barnyard (Paramount, Nickelodeon)
- The Benchwarmers (Sony)
- Big Momma's House 2 (FOX)
- The Black Dahlia (Universal)
- Borat (FOX)
- The Break-Up (Universal)
- Click (Sony)
- The Da Vinci Code (Sony)
- Date Movie (FOX)
- Doogal (TWC)
- The Fountain (Warner Bros.)
- Freedomland (Sony)
- Garfield: A Tail of Two Kitties (FOX)
- Grandma's Boy (FOX)
- The Hills Have Eyes (FOX)
- Hoot (New Line)
- Idiocracy (FOX)
- Inland Empire (518)
- Just My Luck (FOX)
- Larry the Cable Guy: Health Inspector (Lionsgate)
- London (Sony)
- Madea's Family Reunion (Lionsgate)
- Marie Antoinette (Sony)
- Material Girls (MGM)
- Nacho Libre (Paramount)
- National Lampoon's Pledge This! (Pop Films)
- The Pink Panther (Sony/MGM)
- Poseidon (Warner Bros.)
- RV (Sony)
- Rocky Balboa (Sony/MGM)
- The Santa Clause 3: The Escape Clause (Disney)
- A Scanner Darkly (Warner Bros.)
- Scary Movie 4 (Dimension)
- The Shaggy Dog (Disney)
- Silent Hill (Sony)
- Stick It (Touchstone)
- The Tiger and the Snow (Strand)
- Ultraviolet (Sony)
- Wassup Rockers (First Look)
- The Wild (Disney)

=== Other Categories ===
Worst Movie Title: Talladega Nights: The Ballad of Ricky Bobby; Barnyard: The Original Party Animals; Borat! Cultural Learnings of America for Make Benefit Glorious Nation of Kazakstan; The Santa Clause 3: The Escape Clause; Snakes on a Plane	Worst Director: Uwe Boll for BloodRayne; Brian De Palma for The Black Dahlia; David Lynch for Inland Empire; M. Night Shyamalan for Lady in the Water; Keenen Ivory Wayans for Little Man
Worst Actor: Tim Allen in The Santa Clause 3: The Escape Clause, The Shaggy Dog and Zoom; Roberto Benigni in The Tiger and the Snow; Nicolas Cage in The Wicker Man; Steve Martin in The Pink Panther; Marlon Wayans in Little Man	Worst Actress: Julianne Moore in Freedomland; Amanda Bynes in She's the Man; Hilary and Haylie Duff in Material Girls; Paris Hilton in National Lampoon's Pledge This!; Sharon Stone in Basic Instinct 2
Worst Supporting Actor: Chevy Chase in Doogal and Zoom; Meatloaf Aday in BloodRayne; Woody Harrelson in A Scanner Darkly; Martin Short in The Santa Clause 3: The Escape Clause; Burt Young in Rocky Balboa	Worst Supporting Actress: Cindy Cheung in Lady in the Water; Courteney Cox in Zoom; Cloris Leachman in Beerfest; Michelle Rodriguez in BloodRayne; Fiona Shaw in The Black Dahlia
Worst Screenplay: Date Movie (FOX), written by Aaron Seltzer and Jason Friedberg; BloodRayne (Romar Entertainment), written by Guinevere Turner; based on the BloodRayne video game franchise; Lady in the Water (Warner Bros.), written by M. Night Shyamalan; Little Man (Columbia/Revolution), written by Keenen Ivory, Marlon, and Shawn Wayans; Zoom (Columbia/Revolution), written by Adam Rifkin and David Berenbaum	Most Painfully Unfunny Comedy: Date Movie (FOX); Beerfest (Warner Bros.); Deck the Halls (FOX); Jackass Number 2 (Paramount, MTV); Little Man (Columbia/Revolution)
Worst Song or Song Performance in a Film or Its End Credits: "Snakes on a Plane (Bring It)" by Cobra Starship from Snakes on a Plane; "Check On It (Pink Panther)" by Beyoncé feat. Slim Thug from The Pink Panther; "Dreamz with a Z" by Mandy Moore from American Dreamz; "The Hava Nagila Slide" by DJ Quik from Keeping Up With The Steins; "O Kazakhstan" by Sacha Baron Cohen from Borat	Most Intrusive Musical Score: Find Me Guilty (Freestyle); Freedomland (Columbia); Marie Antoinette (Columbia); When a Stranger Calls (Screen Gems); Zoom (Columbia/Revolution)
Worst On-Screen Couple: Shawn Wayans and Marlon Wayans in Little Man; Danny DeVito and Matthew Broderick in Deck the Halls; Hilary and Haylie Duff in Material Girls; Cuba Gooding Jr. and Helen Mirren in Shadowboxer; Josh Hartnett and either Aaron Eckhart, Hilary Swank, or Scarlett Johansson in The Black Dahlia	The Spencer Breslin Award (for Worst Performance by a Child in a Feature Role): Spencer Breslin in The Santa Clause 3: The Escape Clause, The Shaggy Dog and Zoom; Tristan Lake Leabu in Superman Returns; Grayson Russell in Talladega Nights: The Ballad of Ricky Bobby; Dominique Saldana in Unaccompanied Minors; Houston Tumlin in Talladega Nights: The Ballad of Ricky Bobby
Worst Ensemble: BloodRayne (Romar Entertainment); The Black Dahlia (Universal); Deck the Halls (FOX); Lady in the Water (Warner Bros.); Zoom (Columbia/Revolution)	Foulest Family Film: Zoom (Columbia/Revolution); Deck the Halls (FOX); Doogal (TWC); Garfield: A Tail of Two Kitties (FOX); Hoot (New Line)
Worst Animated Film: Doogal (TWC); Barnyard (Paramount, Nickelodeon); Garfield: A Tail of Two Kitties (FOX); A Scanner Darkly (Warner Independent); The Wild (Disney)	Worst Christmas Film: Unaccompanied Minors (Warner Bros.); Black Christmas (Dimension, MGM); Deck the Halls (FOX); The Holiday (Columbia); The Santa Clause 3: The Escape Clause (Disney)
Most Annoying Fake Accent (Male): Sacha Baron Cohen in Borat and Talladega Nights: The Ballad of Ricky Bobby; Jack Black in Nacho Libre; Mos Def in 16 Blocks; Will Ferrell in Talladega Nights: The Ballad of Ricky Bobby; Kevin Kline in The Pink Panther; Steve Martin in The Pink Panther; Joe Pantoliano in Larry the Cable Guy: Health Inspector; Sean Penn in All the King's Men; John C. Reilly in Talladega Nights: The Ballad of Ricky Bobby; Paul Walker in Running Scared	Most Annoying Fake Accent (Female): Cindy Cheung in Lady in the Water; Maria Bello in Flicka; Amanda Bynes in She's the Man; Jennifer Coolidge in Date Movie; Cloris Leachman in Beerfest; Tovah Feldshuh in Just My Luck; Julianne Moore in Freedomland; Anna Paquin in X-Men: The Last Stand; Michelle Rodriguez in BloodRayne; Grace Zabriskie in Inland Empire
Worst Remake: The Wicker Man (Warner Bros.); All the King's Men (Columbia); Poseidon (Warner Bros.); School for Scoundrels (MGM); The Shaggy Dog (Disney)	Worst Sequel: The Santa Clause 3: The Escape Clause (Disney); Basic Instinct 2 (Sony/MGM); Big Momma's House 2 (FOX); Scary Movie 4 (Dimension); Van Wilder 2: The Rise of Taj (MGM)
Least "Special" Special Effects: BloodRayne (Romar Entertainment); Eragon (FOX); Little Man (Columbia/Revolution); Ultraviolet (Screen Gems); Zoom (Columbia/Revolution)	Least Scary Horror Film: Lady in the Water (Warner Bros.); An American Haunting (Freestyle); BloodRayne (Romar Entertainment); The Grudge 2 (Columbia); When a Stranger Calls (Screen Gems)
Worst On-Screen Hairstyle: Tom Hanks in The Da Vinci Code; Amanda Bynes in She's the Man; Judi Dench in Notes on a Scandal; Vin Diesel in Find Me Guilty; Christopher Guest in For Your Consideration; Woody Harrelson in A Scanner Darkly; Tristan Lake Leabu in Superman Returns; Cody Linley in Hoot; Natalie Portman in V for Vendetta; David Spade in The Benchwarmers	Most Overrated Film: Babel (Paramount); Bobby (TWC, MGM); Dreamgirls (DreamWorks, Paramount); Inland Empire (518); The Pursuit of Happyness (Columbia)

== Films with multiple wins and nominations ==
The following films received multiple nominations:

Nominations	Film
10	Zoom
9	BloodRayne
7	Lady in the Water
7	Little Man
6	The Santa Clause 3: The Escape Clause
6	Talladega Nights: The Ballad of Ricky Bobby
5	Deck the Halls
4	The Pink Panther
3	Basic Instinct 2
3	Beerfest
3	The Black Dahlia
3	Borat
3	Date Movie
3	Doogal
3	Freedomland
3	Inland Empire
3	A Scanner Darkly
3	The Shaggy Dog
3	She's the Man
2	All the King's Men
2	Barnyard
2	Find Me Guilty
2	Garfield: A Tail of Two Kitties
2	Hoot
2	Larry the Cable Guy: Health Inspector
2	Material Girls
2	Snakes on a Plane
2	Superman Returns
2	Unaccompanied Minors
2	When a Stranger Calls
2	The Wicker Man

The following films received multiple wins:

Wins	Film
4	BloodRayne
4	Zoom
3	Lady in the Water
3	The Santa Clause 3: The Escape Clause
2	Date Movie
2	Doogal
2	The Shaggy Dog
2	Talladega Nights: The Ballad of Ricky Bobby
