= Joe DiPietro =

American playwright and lyricist

- Born: 1961 (age 64–65); Teaneck, New Jersey, U.S.
- Education: Rutgers University
- Occupations: Playwright; lyricist
- Years active: 1991–present

Joe DiPietro (born 1961) is an American playwright, lyricist and author. He is best known for the Tony Award-winning musical Memphis, for which he won the Tony Awards for Best Book of a Musical and Best Original Score as well as for writing the book and lyrics for the long-running off-Broadway show I Love You, You're Perfect, Now Change.

== Biography ==
Born in Teaneck, New Jersey, DiPietro grew up in nearby Oradell, the son of Lou and Jean DiPietro. He attended Oradell Public School and River Dell High School, before graduating Phi Beta Kappa from Rutgers University in 1984 with a bachelor's degree in English.

DiPietro is openly gay.

== Work ==
Following a run of Love Lemmings at the Top of the Village Gate in 1991, DiPietro's first produced work was I Love You, You're Perfect, Now Change, written with composer Jimmy Roberts, which ran for twelve years (5,003 performances) off-Broadway at the Westside Theatre. He followed that up with 1998's comedy Over the River and Through the Woods, which played the John Houseman Theatre for 800 performances over two years.

DiPietro's work made its Broadway debut in 2005 with the Elvis Presley jukebox musical All Shook Up. The Toxic Avenger, written with Bon Jovi's David Bryan, debuted off-Broadway on April 6, 2009, and won the Outer Critics Circle Award for Outstanding New Off-Broadway Musical.

DiPietro and Bryan's Memphis won the 2010 Tony Award for Best Musical. It ran at the Shubert Theatre for three years (1,165 performances) and continues in touring production all over the country. DiPietro won Tony Awards for Best Book and Best Score, and the show also received the Tony, Drama Desk, and Outer Critics Circle Awards for Best Musical.

Nice Work If You Can Get It, a re-imagining of a Gershwin musical, starring Matthew Broderick and Kelli O'Hara, opened at Broadway's Imperial Theatre in 2012. The show, and DiPietro's book, were nominated for Tony Awards in 2012, and DiPietro won the Drama Desk Award for Best Book of a Musical.

Clever Little Lies ran in late 2013 at George Street Playhouse and debuted in New York's Westside Theatre in 2015 with Marlo Thomas and Greg Mullavey.

The musical Chasing the Song, which reunited DiPietro with Bryan, was workshopped at La Jolla Playhouse in the summer of 2014. 2014 also saw DiPietro reworking the Garson Kanin play Peccadillo into Living on Love, which starred the opera star Renée Fleming and was a highlight of the 2014 Williamstown Theatre Festival.

Other recent plays include Creating Claire, which debuted at George Street Playhouse in 2010, and The Last Romance, which played the Old Globe in 2010 after debuting at Kansas City's New Theatre in 2008. and Ernest Shackleton Loves Me (with the score written by Val Vigoda and Brendan Milburn of GrooveLily fame.) Shackleton was shown as part of the PBS series Broadway on HD, on November 26, 2018.

Diana, a musical treatment of the life of Diana, Princess of Wales with lyrics and book by DiPietro, was scheduled to open on Broadway in March 2020, but was postponed due the COVID-19 pandemic. The production was filmed for Netflix and opened subsequently on Broadway in November 2021.

== Plays ==
- 2025 3 Summers of Lincoln (musical) (book and lyrics)
- 2023 Babbit, an adaptation of the novel
- 2021 What's New Pussycat? (book) featuring the songs of Tom Jones based on Henry Fielding's 1749 novel The History of Tom Jones, a Foundling
- 2020 Conscience (author) based on Sen. Margaret Chase Smith of Maine's early declaration in the 1950s McCarthy era
- 2019 Diana (book and lyrics) with music by David Bryan
- 2017 Ernest Shackleton Loves Me with score by Val Vigoda and Brendan Milburn of GrooveLily
- 2014 Chasing The Song (still in workshop) (book and lyrics) with music by David Bryan of Bon Jovi
- 2014 Living On Love (author)
- 2013 Clever Little Lies (author)
- 2012 Nice Work If You Can Get It (Broadway) (book)
- 2010 Creating Claire (author)
- 2010 Falling For Eve (book)
- 2008 The Toxic Avenger book and lyrics with music by David Bryan, based on the movie
- 2008 Fucking Men, an adaptation of Schnitzler's La Ronde (1897)
- 2008 The Last Romance (author)
- 2005 All Shook Up (Broadway) (book)
- 2004 Allegro (adaptation, writer)
- 2003 The Thing About Men (Off-Broadway) (book, lyrics) (musical version of the German comedy film by Doris Dörrie, Männer... (Men...), from 1985) with music by Jimmy Roberts
- 2002 Memphis (book and lyrics) with music by David Bryan of Bon Jovi
- 2002 Babes in Arms (adaptation, writer)
- 2001 They All Laughed (book) (a very loose adaptation of Oh, Kay!)
- 2000 Art of Murder (author)
- 1998 Over the River and Through the Woods (Off-Broadway) (author)
- 1998 Kiss at City Hall (author)
- 1996 I Love You, You're Perfect, Now Change (Off-Broadway) (book and lyrics) with music by Jimmy Roberts
- 1994 The Virgin Weeps (author)
- 1991 Love Lemmings (author, lyricist)

== Awards and nominations ==
Year	Award	Category	Work	Result
2009	Drama Desk Award	Outstanding Book of a Musical	The Toxic Avenger	Nominated
2010	Tony Award	Best Book of a Musical	Memphis	Won
2010	Tony Award	Best Original Score	Memphis	Won
2010	Drama Desk Award	Outstanding Book of a Musical	Memphis	Nominated
2012	Tony Award	Best Book of a Musical	Nice Work If You Can Get It	Nominated
2012	Drama Desk Award	Outstanding Book of a Musical	Nice Work If You Can Get It	Won
2012	Outer Critics Circle Award	Outstanding Book of a Musical	Nice Work If You Can Get It	Nominated
2015	Laurence Olivier Award	Outstanding Musical Contribution	Memphis	Nominated
2022	Golden Raspberry Awards	Worst Picture	Diana	Won
2022	Golden Raspberry Awards	Worst Screenplay	Diana	Won
