= Karen (film) =

2021 film by Coke Daniels

- Theatrical release poster
- Directed by: Coke Daniels
- Written by: Coke Daniels
- Produced by: Autumn Bailey-Ford; Taryn Manning; Cory Hardrict; Tirrell Whittley; Sevier Crespo; Mary Aloe; Gillian Hormel; Coke Daniels
- Starring: Taryn Manning; Cory Hardrict; Jasmine Burke; Roger Dorman; Brandon Sklenar; Gregory Alan Williams
- Cinematography: Anthony J. Rickert-Epstein
- Edited by: Aziza Ngozi
- Music by: Om'mas Keith
- Production companies: BET Original Movies; Flixville USA
- Distributed by: Quiver Distribution
- Release date: September 3, 2021
- Running time: 89 minutes
- Country: United States
- Language: English

Karen is a 2021 American black horror film written and directed by Coke Daniels. The film stars Taryn Manning, Cory Hardrict, Jasmine Burke, Roger Dorman, Brandon Sklenar, and Gregory Alan Williams. The title is a reference to the "Karen" stereotype in American popular culture.

Karen was released in the United States on September 3, 2021, by Quiver Distribution. It was universally panned upon release and received five nominations at the 42nd Golden Raspberry Awards, including Worst Picture and Worst Actress for Manning.

== Plot ==
Malik and Imani Jeffries, a young black couple, move into a new house in the fictional affluent suburban Atlanta community of Harvey Hill, named after Confederate general Daniel Harvey Hill. Harvey Hill Homeowners Association president Karen Drexler, their next-door neighbor and a widowed stay-at-home mother of two, quickly introduces herself to Malik; she refuses to shake his hand, callously comments about not "having any cash" in her home, and installs a security camera directed towards their house. Although perplexed by her behavior, the couple decides to ignore their concerns and focus on settling in.

Unbeknownst to both, the virulently racist Karen has Neo-Confederate memorabilia in her home and a reputation for abusing her power as president to target local black residents, often recruiting her equally racist brother, Atlanta Police Department patrolman Michael Wind, to assist her. She soon starts harassing and stalking the couple, trying to find something she can use to remove them from Harvey Hill. She discovers that Malik secretly smokes marijuana and catches her seventeen-year-old son Kyle watching the couple have sex through an open window, but when she raises the issue at a meeting of the association's executive board, the other members, disturbed by her bigoted remarks about African Americans, decide against taking any action.

After learning about a housewarming party that the couple is holding for their friends and neighbors, Karen convinces Imani that she wants to reconcile and is invited. At the party, she immediately offends the attendees by insinuating that if black Americans are unhappy about living in the country, they should simply relocate to Africa. The next day, she demands that a trio of black adolescents identify themselves. When they refuse, she notifies Mike via his phone number, falsely accusing them of harassment. The teenagers are released from jail after video footage of her phone call, recorded by the trio, and their subsequent arrest, recorded by Imani on her cellphone, surfaces. The Homeowners Association then dismisses her as president after being sued by prominent civil rights lawyer Charles Wright, the father of one of the young men.

Increasingly deranged and frustrated, Karen gets Mike to pull Malik over while driving home from work by revealing his past marijuana usage. Finding no marijuana in Malik's car, Mike plants a bag of the substance in the trunk, subsequently arresting him following a physical altercation. After his rookie partner, Officer Hill, accuses him of racism, Mike threatens to kill Hill if he ever double-crosses him again in the field, warning that a secret fraternal order within law enforcement known as "the brotherhood" shields him against any charges. Malik manages to post his own bail and arrives home the following morning. Karen then visits Imani, asking her and Malik to leave the neighborhood to avoid further trouble, but Imani defiantly declines. The couple then hires Charles to represent them; he produces a file suggesting that after a Black vigilante killed her police officer husband Ken Drexler and two other officers a few years earlier, Karen became unhinged and was later dismissed from her job as an elementary school teacher for making racist remarks towards her students.

That night, Mike, alerted by Karen of recent events, arrives with a falsified search warrant and arrests Malik again for owning an unregistered handgun, and Imani tearfully calls Charles, who calls the precinct and discovers Malik was not formally booked. Meanwhile, Karen cuts the power to the couple's house and breaks in with a gun. While Imani defends herself with a sword, Karen shoots at her several times, prompting a neighbor to call the police. Mike immediately rushes to Imani's house, where the siblings threaten her at gunpoint before Karen shoots her in the shoulder, seemingly killing her. Hill rushes in, and a standoff ensues until Mike and Hill shoot each other at close range; Mike is killed while Hill is only slightly wounded. Karen prepares to finish him off, but a still-alive Imani grabs Mike's gun and kills her in self-defense.

After Malik's release from custody, he and Imani receive a full apology and compensation from the city for their ordeal. Imani, now pregnant, assumes Karen's position within the Homeowners Association and successfully renames the community to John Lewis.

== Cast ==
- Taryn Manning as Karen Drexler (née Wind)
- Cory Hardrict as Malik Jeffries
- Jasmine Burke as Imani Jeffries
- Roger Dorman as Officer Mike Wind
- Brandon Sklenar as Officer Hill
- Gregory Alan Williams as Charles Wright
- Veronika Bozeman as Fatima
- Dawn Halfkenny as Chanel McFadden
- Jaxon McHan as Kyle

== Production ==
Principal photography began in Georgia, Georgia in December 2020.

== Release ==
In August 2021, Quiver Distribution acquired the North American distribution rights to Karen. The film was subsequently released both theatrically and on demand on September 3, 2021.

== Reception ==
=== Critical response ===
Karen was overwhelmingly panned by critics upon its release. On the review aggregator website Rotten Tomatoes, the film holds an approval rating of 17% based on 24 reviews.

Nick Allen of RogerEbert.com criticized the film’s lack of direction, stating that it "is clueless about how to be a thriller, in either a serious or tongue-in-cheek way." He added, "Even with the most basic forms of gratuitous schlock, Karen does not try." Michael Nordine of Variety wrote that "anyone subjected to this... will want to get out of the theater as quickly as possible." He called the film a "parade of clichés" and criticized its lack of depth and tension. Nordine also pointed out its "shaky production values" and "painfully unsubtle script," concluding that it failed both as a thriller and a satire.

Richard Roeper of Chicago Sun-Times, called Karen a "poorly executed tale of a hateful racist," arguing that it "contains no valuable insight or social commentary" and "simply plays like a Greatest Hits... of horrific, racist, hateful behavior." He further added that the film is "an extended SNL parody of a Jordan Peele film." Elizabeth Weitzman of TheWrap described the film as a "genuine jaw-dropper on multiple levels." She noted that delivers its messages "with all the subtlety of a meme."

== Accolades ==
Award	Date of ceremony	Category	Recipient(s)	Result	Ref.
Golden Raspberry Awards	26 March 2022	Worst Picture	Mary Aloe, Sevier Crespo, Coke Daniels, Cory Hardrict and Taryn Manning	Nominated	
Golden Raspberry Awards	26 March 2022	Worst Director	Coke Daniels	Nominated	
Golden Raspberry Awards	26 March 2022	Worst Actress	Taryn Manning	Nominated	
Golden Raspberry Awards	26 March 2022	Worst Screenplay	Coke Daniels	Nominated	
Golden Raspberry Awards	26 March 2022	Worst Prequel, Remake, Rip-off or Sequel	Karen (Inadvertent remake of Cruella)	Nominated	
