= Diana (musical) =

2019 musical

- Broadway promotional poster
- Music: David Bryan
- Lyrics: David Bryan; Joe DiPietro
- Book: Joe DiPietro
- Basis: The life of Diana, Princess of Wales
- Productions: 2019 La Jolla Playhouse; 2021 Broadway; 2023 London concert 2026 Brazil

Diana is a musical with music and lyrics by David Bryan and Joe DiPietro, and a book by DiPietro, based on the life of Diana, Princess of Wales. A filmed performance was released on Netflix on 1 October 2021, to negative reviews.

== Plot ==
=== Act 1 ===
In 1980, 19 year old Lady Diana Spencer attends a party thrown by Prince Charles at Buckingham Palace and meets Camilla Parker Bowles, Charles' mistress ("Underestimated"). Meanwhile, Queen Elizabeth II is looking for Charles to get married, and he brings up Diana as a possibility, although he has recently broken off a relationship with her older sister Sarah. The Queen encourages Charles to begin the courting process, as she believes Diana would be perfect for what the staff calls ("The Worst Job in England").

Charles sends Diana a necklace and invites her to a performance by cellist Mstislav Rostropovich. There, she meets Camilla again and starts to become a lot more suspicious of her and her relationship with Charles. While the performance is going on, she imagines a more punk-rock version of the concert, more in line with her interests ("This Is How Your People Dance"). After the performance, as Camilla watches Charles and Diana leave, Camilla ponders that Diana is the people's idea of a princess. ("That Is How Your People Danced")

The press takes note of Diana's growing relationship with Charles and starts hounding her ("Snap, Click"). Charles is still unsure about marrying Diana, but the Queen tells him that he can keep his close relationship with Camilla while marrying Diana. Charles proposes to her, but tells Camilla he will break it off if that's what she wants. Camilla tells Charles to go ahead with the wedding, and he assures her he will be there for her. A nervous Diana moves in to Buckingham Palace ("Whatever Love Means Anyway"). Soon after, despite some reservations from Diana, she and Charles get married ("I Will"). Camilla's husband Andrew, having affairs of his own, assures Camilla that they will make their own complicated marriage work ("I Will (Tag)").

Diana's first public appearance happens in Wales, and even though the townsfolk are skeptical at first, they, as well as the whole country, become enamored with Diana. Charles starts to become jealous of Diana's newfound fame ("The World Fell in Love"). Camilla tells Charles that Andrew has cut off all his other relations, hoping to reignite their own marriage, and Camilla breaks up the affair, saying she would be the most hated woman in England if she was found out. ("You Do Your Duty") Diana tells Charles that she is pregnant ("A Baby, Charles)" and soon after their son William is born. Diana walks in on Charles talking sweetly on the phone to Camilla, who he hasn't talked to in months. Camilla says that Andrew is being stationed more and more overseas. Diana is very hurt by Charles' lack of affection towards her and becomes depressed, even after having their second child, Harry. This culminates in her smashing a window with her hand ("Simply Breathe").

Sarah convinces Diana to fight back and do more with her power, so she decides to become more and more involved with charity, leading to even more popularity, especially after a surprise performance at the Royal Ballet Christmas Gala ("She Moves in the Most Modern Ways"). Charles is enraged at this and reminds Diana that her only achievement is marrying him ("The Rage"). Diana realises this might be the end of any hope of love in her marriage ("As I Love You"). Charles visits Camilla late at night and she says she still loves him and would like to continue their affair ("I Miss You Most on Sundays"). Diana decides to use the press and newfound popularity to get back at Charles and fight back against the norms of British society. Despite Charles' attempt to fight back, she succeeds and becomes more popular ("A Pretty, Pretty Girl").

=== Act 2 ===
Barbara Cartland, novelist and Diana's step-grandmother, introduces the audience to James Hewitt, a war hero who has recently come home. He and Diana begin their own affair ("Here Comes James Hewitt"). Barbara notes that the two affairs between Diana and James as well as Charles and Camilla are filled with more love and happiness than Charles and Diana's marriage ("Him and Her and Him and Her"). Diana tries to talk to Charles, but he wants to "(Just Dance)". Charles' valet Colin lets him know of Diana and James' relationship, but he decides to let it go as he is happy with Camilla.

Despite Charles’ worries, Diana goes to a clinic for AIDS patients and bonds with the men there ("Secrets and Lies"). Soon after, Diana learns from Sarah that Charles and Camilla go out almost every night with their friends, and Diana decides to crash a party for Camilla's sister. At the party, their friends, usually bored by Charles, are excited that they get to witness ("The Main Event") which leads to a confrontation between Diana, Camilla, and Charles. On the car ride home, Charles reveals he knows about Diana's relationship with James, which he says he doesn't care about and that the boys will be fine as long as they both love them ("Whatever Love Means Anyway (Reprise)"). Diana is excited to tell James, but he reveals that he has been stationed in Germany and will be there for two years. ("I Do My Duty") Diana, suspecting Charles, vows to get revenge ("Pretty, Pretty Girl (Reprise)"). The press increasingly hounds Charles about his failing marriage ("Snap, Click (Reprise)"). Diana contacts Andrew Morton, a writer who is writing a book on her, and agrees to give anonymous quotes to him, bashing Charles, Camilla, and the monarchy. The book is published and is the talk of the country ("The Words Came Pouring Out").

Charles tries to get the Queen to meet Camilla, but she refuses. Charles decides to go on TV, tell the truth about his affair, and try to win back some favour from the public ("I Miss You Most on Sundays (Reprise)"). Diana learns about the interview from Paul, her butler and friend, who comes up with the idea that she draw attention away from it by wearing a "F-You" Dress ("The Dress"). As the Palace Staff laments, ("Staff Quartet") The Queen agrees to a divorce between Diana and Charles. She laments that it didn't work out while reflecting on her own marriage ("An Officer's Wife"), and tells Diana "don't be foolish". Diana is excited to start a new life with her boys, but it is tragically cut short by a car accident. Charles and the company tell the audience that "the people who will change the world are not the ones you think will change the world." ("If (Light of the World)")

== Musical numbers ==
=== La Jolla Playhouse ===
Act 1

- "Once Upon a Time"
- "In the Pages of Her Books"
- "Snap, Click"
- "This Is How Your People Dance"
- "Whatever Love Means Anyway"
- "The Wedding"
- "Welcome to the Windsors"
- "Perfect Princess"
- "Happiness"
- "Simply Breathe"
- "Princess Di Floating"
- "Diana (The Rage)"
- "As I Love You"
- "Pretty, Pretty Girl"

Act 2

- "Here Comes James Hewitt"
- "Him & Her (& Him & Her)"
- "Just Dance"
- "Secrets and Lies"
- "The Show"
- "The Words Came Pouring Out"
- "Diana (Reprise)"
- "The Dress"
- "An Officer’s Wife"
- "If"

=== Broadway ===
Act I

- "Underestimated" - Diana and Ensemble
- "The Worst Job in England" - Palace Staff, Queen Elizabeth, Prince Charles
- "This Is How Your People Dance" - Diana, Prince Charles and Palace Staff
- "That Was How Your People Danced" † - Camilla
- "Snap, Click" - Paparazzi
- "Whatever Love Means Anyway" - Queen Elizabeth, Prince Charles, Barbara Cartland, Camilla, Ensemble, Paparazzi, Paul and Palace Staff
- "I Will" - Diana, Prince Charles and Citizens
- "We Will" † - Andrew, Camilla
- "The World Fell in Love" - Prince Charles, Queen Elizabeth, Diana, Camilla and Welsh Citizens
- "You Do Your Duty" † - Palace Staff
- "A Baby" † - Diana
- "Happiness/Simply Breathe" - Physicians, Diana and Prince Charles
- "She Moves in the Most Modern Ways" - Queen Elizabeth II, Sarah, Camilla, Charles, Paul, Colin, Ritzy Audience,
- "Diana (The Rage)" - Prince Charles
- "As I Love You" - Diana
- "I Miss You Most on Sundays" - Camilla
- "Pretty, Pretty Girl" - Diana, Sarah, Camilla, Prince Charles, Queen Elizabeth, Photographers and Ensemble

Act II

- "Here Comes James Hewitt" - Barbara Cartland, James Hewitt and Citizens of England
- "Him & Her (& Him & Her)" - James, Diana, Barbara Cartland, Prince Charles and Camilla
- "Just Dance" - Prince Charles, Diana, James Hewitt, Colin, Camilla and Ensemble
- "Secrets and Lies" - Patients, Diana and Ensemble
- "The Main Event" - Charles's Friends, Diana, Camilla and Prince Charles
- "Whatever Love Means Anyway – Reprise" - Prince Charles
- "I Do My Duty" - James Hewitt
- "Pretty, Pretty Girl – Reprise" - Diana
- "Snap, Click (Reprise)" † – Paparazzi
- "The Words Came Pouring Out" - Diana, Andrew Morton, Camilla, Queen Elizabeth, Prince Charles and Citizens Of England
- "I Miss You Most on Sundays – Reprise" † - Camilla
- "The Dress" - Paul, Diana, Queen Elizabeth and Paparazzi
- "The Servant Quartet" † - Palace Staff
- "An Officer’s Wife" - Queen Elizabeth, Officers’ Wives and Naval Officers
- "If (Light The World)" - Diana, Full Company

† Not featured on the cast recording

=== London ===
Act I

- "Prologue" - Ensemble
- "Underestimated" - Diana and Ensemble
- "The Worst Job In England" - Diana, Queen Elizabeth, Charles and Ensemble
- "This Is How Your People Dance" - Diana, Young Diana, Charles and Ensemble
- "This Was How Your People Danced" - Diana
- "Snap Click" - Ensemble
- "Whatever Love Means Anyway" - Charles, Camilla and Ensemble
- "I Will" - Diana, Young Diana and Ensemble
- "The World Fell In Love" - Queen Elizabeth, Charles, Camilla and Ensemble
- "A Baby" - Young Diana
- "She Moves In The Most Modern Ways" - Queen Elizabeth, Camilla, Sarah and Ensemble
- "Diana (The Rage)" - Charles
- "As I Love You" - Diana, Young Diana
- "I Miss You Most On Sundays" - Charles and Camilla
- "Pretty, Pretty Girl" -Diana, Charles and Camilla

Act II

- "Here Comes James Hewitt" - James Hewitt and Ensemble
- "Him and Her" - Diana and James Hewitt
- "Just Dance" - Diana, Young Diana, Charles, Camilla, James Hewitt and Ensemble
- "The Main Event" - Diana, Charles, Camilla and Ensemble
- "Whatever Love Means Anyway (Reprise)" - Charles
- "Pretty, Pretty Girl" (Reprise) - Diana
- "The Words Came Pouring Out" - Diana, Charles, Camilla and Ensemble
- "The Dress" - Diana and Ensemble
- "Palace Staff Quartet" - Ensemble
- "An Officer’s Wife" - Queen Elizabeth and Ensemble
- "If" - Diana and Ensemble

== Casts ==
| Character | San Diego | Broadway | London |
| Character | 2019 | 2021 | 2023 |
|---|---|---|---|
| Princess Diana | Jeanna de Waal | Jeanna de Waal | Kerry Ellis |
| Camilla Parker Bowles | Erin Davie | Erin Davie | Alice Fearn |
| Prince Charles | Roe Hartrampf | Roe Hartrampf | Andy Coxon |
| Queen Elizabeth II / Barbara Cartland | Judy Kaye | Judy Kaye | Denise Welch |
| Sarah Spencer | Holly Ann Butler | Holly Ann Butler | Aleyna Mohanraj |
| Paul Burrell | Bruce Dow | Anthony Murphy | n/a |
| James Hewitt | Gareth Keegan | Gareth Keegan | Jay Perry |
| Andrew Morton | Nathan Lucrezio | Nathan Lucrezio | n/a |
| Andrew Parker Bowles | n/a | Zach Adkins | n/a |
| Colin | Jamen Nanthakumar | André Jordan | n/a |
| Graham | Evan Duff | Chris Medlin | n/a |
| Johnnie Spencer | Eric Coles | n/a | n/a |
| Young Diana | Lauren Livia Muehl | n/a | Maiya Quansah-Breed |

== Production history ==
Previews for Diana began on 19 February 2019, at the La Jolla Playhouse. The world premiere of Diana opened the following month on 3 March. The limited run was extended twice and closed on 14 April 2019. The production was directed by Christopher Ashley with choreography by Kelly Devine. Costumes were designed by William Ivey Long and Nic Rackow, Scenic design was designed by David Zinn, Lighting was designed by Natasha Katz, and Sound was designed by Gareth Owen. The production's orchestrations were composed by John Clancy.

Following the La Jolla production, the producers continued workshopping the musical. The production was eventually picked up and began previews at the Longacre Theatre on Broadway on 2 March 2020 with the same directing team.

The show was planned to open on 31 March 2020, but on 12 March the show suspended production due to the COVID-19 pandemic. On 30 March 2021, it was announced the show would resume previews on 1 December, with an official opening set for 16 December. On 14 May 2021, it was announced that previews would begin on 2 November, with an opening night set for 17 November, nearly a month earlier than initially announced.The New York Times reported that the show played to 51 percent capacity and grossed $374,000 in the week ending 12 December 2021. The show closed on 19 December after a total of 33 performances and 16 previews.

As of 11 January 2023, the show is now available for licensing through Broadway Licensing for both professional regional and amateur productions.

On 14 June 2023, a concert version of the musical was announced to premiere in London, at the Eventim Apollo, on 4 December 2023. The concert starred Maiya Quansah-Breed as 19-year-old Diana Spencer and Kerry Ellis playing an older Princess Diana, reflecting back on her life. Guest starring as Queen Elizabeth was British actress Denise Welch.

On February 27, 2026, a Portuguese language non-replica production retitled Diana - The People's Princess written by Estamos Aqui Produções with direction by Tadeu Aguiar premiered at the Teatro Multiplan in Rio de Janeiro, Brazil and was transferred to the Teatro Liberdade in São Paulo on May 15. The cast features Sara Sarres as Diana, Claudio Lins as Charles, Giselle Prattes as Camilla, Simone Centurione as Queen Elizabeth. The Rio de Janeiro show ran for 19 performances until March 15 2026 while the São Paulo run will conclude on July 5 after 40 performances.

On 1 March 2026, the first production of the musical to be staged in Australia was mounted by Hyde Entertainment in the Playhouse of the Civic Theatre in Newcastle, Australia. The cast featured Ava Gilbert as Diana, Joshua Davies as Charles, Amber Curby as Camilla, Jennifer Halliburton as Queen Elizabeth, Alanna Sofia as Sarah Spencer, Jaidyn Arthur as James Hewitt, Raphael Teixeira as Andrew Parker-Bowles and Andrew Morton, Miranda Smith as Barbara Cartland, and an ensemble composed of Maddy Clare, Elianne Bierman, and Nikita Lloyd. The production was co-directed by Hyde Entertainment's founder Seb Smee as well as Jack Madden (who also portrayed Paul Burrell), was choreographed by Olivia Prentice, and ran for seven performances until 8 March 2026.

== Reception ==
The La Jolla production received mostly negative reviews from critics. On the review aggregator website Rotten Tomatoes, 12% of 34 critics' reviews are positive, with an average rating of 3.1/10. The website's consensus reads: "Diana done dirty." Metacritic, which uses a weighted average, assigned the film a score of 29 out of 100, based on 8 critics, indicating "generally unfavorable" reviews.

Charles McNulty of the Los Angeles Times wrote: "The score is actually closer to commercial Broadway in the early aughts, an even more dated style to my ear." The Guardian gave the Netflix recording a one-star review, stating "If it was deliberate satire it would be genius, but it’s not."

Jesse Green, chief theater critic for The New York Times, negatively reviewed the production at Broadway's Longacre Theatre, deeming it tawdry and exploitative, and writing, "if you care about Diana as a human being, or dignity as a concept, you will find this treatment of her life both aesthetically and morally mortifying."

=== Accolades ===
| Year | Award | Category | Recipient(s) | Result | Ref. |
|---|---|---|---|---|---|
| 2022 | Golden Raspberry Awards | Worst Picture | David Bryan, Joe DiPietro, and Frank Marshall | Won | |
| 2022 | Golden Raspberry Awards | Worst Director | Christopher Ashley | Won | |
| 2022 | Golden Raspberry Awards | Worst Actor | Roe Hartrampf | Nominated | |
| 2022 | Golden Raspberry Awards | Worst Actress | Jeanna de Waal | Won | |
| 2022 | Golden Raspberry Awards | Worst Supporting Actor | Gareth Keegan | Nominated | |
| 2022 | Golden Raspberry Awards | Worst Supporting Actress | Erin Davie | Nominated | |
| 2022 | Golden Raspberry Awards | Worst Supporting Actress | Judy Kaye | Won | |
| 2022 | Golden Raspberry Awards | Worst Screenplay | Joe DiPietro (book & lyrics) and David Bryan (music & lyrics) | Won | |
| 2022 | Golden Raspberry Awards | Worst Screen Combo | Any klutzy cast member & any lamely lyricized (or choreographed) musical number | Nominated | |
| 2022 | Tony Awards | Best Costume Design of a Musical | William Ivey Long | Nominated | |
| 2022 | Drama Desk Awards | Outstanding Actress in a Musical | Jeanna de Waal | Nominated | |
| 2022 | Drama Desk Awards | Outstanding Lighting Design | Natasha Katz | Nominated | |
| 2022 | Drama Desk Awards | Outstanding Wig and Hair Design | Paul Huntley | Nominated | |

== Filmed recording ==
Before opening, the Broadway production was recorded in the summer of 2020 with COVID-19 safety protocols in place and no audience. This capture, also directed by Ashley, was released on Netflix on 1 October 2021. The recording was universally panned by critics and won five of its nine nominations at the 42nd Golden Raspberry Awards, including Worst Picture, the first filmed stage performance with this distinction.
