= I Love You, You're Perfect, Now Change =

1995 musical by Joe DiPietro and Jimmy Roberts

- Original cast recording
- Music: Jimmy Roberts
- Lyrics: Joe DiPietro
- Book: Joe DiPietro
- Productions: 1996 Off-Broadway; 1999 Bromley and London; 1999 Barcelona; 2000 Madrid; 2003 Milan; 2004 Buenos Aires; 2005 London; 2005 Madrid; 2005 Hong Kong; 2007 Beijing; 2007 Taipei; 2010 Ljubljana; 2011 Mexico City; 2011 Oslo; 2011 Moscow; 2011 Buenos Aires Revival; 2012 Milan; 2013 Barcelona; 2013 Istanbul; 2014 Rome; 2014 Barcelona; 2015 Norwich; 2015 London; 2015 Dallas, Texas; 2016 Helsinki; 2016 Theatre on the Bay, Cape Town; 2016 Pieter Toerien Montecasino, Johannesburg; 2017 New Brunswick, New Jersey; 2021 London, Coliseum virtual; 2021 Taipei; 2022 Sandusky Ohio; 2022 Mexico City Revival; 2022 Laguna Beach; 2024 Santiago de Chile

I Love You, You're Perfect, Now Change is a musical comedy with book and lyrics by Joe DiPietro, and music by Jimmy Roberts. It is the second-longest running Off-Broadway musical. The musical was nominated for the Outer Critics Circle Award as Outstanding Off-Broadway musical in 1997.

== Production history ==
The musical premiered Off-Broadway at the Westside Theatre on August 1, 1996, and closed on July 27, 2008, after 5,003 performances. Directed by Joel Bishoff, the cast featured Jordan Leeds, Robert Roznowski, Jennifer Simard, and Melissa Weil.

It was first produced in the town where playwright Joe DiPietro was born, Teaneck, New Jersey. This production ran from February 24 to March 12, 1995, at the American Stage Company Theater (Artistic Director James Vagias and Managing Director Glenn Cherrits), a professional theatre in residence on the campus of Fairleigh Dickinson University, Teaneck, NJ. Directed by Joel Bishoff, the cast included Robert Roznowski, Robert Michael and Melissa Weil.

The musical was first produced in the UK at the Churchill Theatre, Bromley, followed by a short season in the West End Comedy Theatre from July 28, 1999 to September 25, 1999. Directed by Joel Bishoff, the cast featured Clive Carter, Shona Lindsay, Gillian Kirkpatrick, and Russell Wilcox. It was revived in London at the Jermyn Street Theatre, running from March 1, 2005 to March 26, presented by Popular Productions Ltd. This production then opened in Dubai in 2006 and by Maple Giant at the Bridewell Theatre in 2011. The first Cantonese Chinese version debuted in Hong Kong on October 28, 2005, and was produced by Wind Mill Grass Theatre. Another Mandarin Chinese version was produced in Beijing, China, on June 20, 2007, and it had also been reproduced by LANCreators, Taiwan's only group producing Broadway musicals and performed, in English, at the Crown Theatre, Taipei, from November 3, 2007.

It has been translated into at least 17 languages, including Hebrew, Spanish, Dutch, Hungarian, Czech, Slovak, Slovene, Cantonese, Japanese, Korean, Italian, Portuguese, German, Catalan, Finnish, Mandarin, Norwegian, Polish, French, Turkish and Romanian.

It has played sit-down productions in Los Angeles, Toronto, Boston, Chicago, London, Dubai, Tel Aviv, Mexico City, Guadalajara, Barcelona, Istanbul, Amsterdam, Budapest, Sydney, Prague, Bratislava, Seoul, Warsaw, Milan, Rio de Janeiro, Johannesburg, Dublin, Buenos Aires, Berlin, Hong Kong, Shanghai, Beijing, Taipei, Tokyo, Manila, Wiesbaden, Munich, Heidelberg and Christchurch.

In 2008, Kookaburra: The National Musical Theatre Company toured NSW Australia with a version of the production with Australian accents and references. This production was directed by Darren Yap and starred Hayden Tee, Katrina Retallick, Marika Aubrey, and Anthony Harkin. Its nearly sold-out season scheduled for Sydney in April 2009 was canceled after the sudden collapse of Kookaburra.

In 2015, I Love You, You're Perfect, Now Change ran in London in the small studio space named Above The Arts in London's West End in Leicester Square. It starred Julie Atherton, Simon Lipkin, Gina Beck and Samuel Holmes.

In 2017, there was a short run at George Street Playhouse at their interim theater in New Brunswick, New Jersey, starring Mitchell Jarvis, Karen Burthwright, Lindsay Nicole Chambers, and George Merrick.

In 2019, a Cantonese film adaptation directed by Wong Cho-lam was released.

During 2024, a new production was produced by the Wolverhampton Grand Theatre; it ran at the theatre for eight performances from 16-20 July before moving to the Edinburgh Fringe Festival for the summer, from 2-24 August 2024.

== Synopsis ==
I Love You, You're Perfect, Now Change is presented in the form of a series of vignettes connected by the central theme of love and relationships. The play's tagline is "Everything you have ever secretly thought about dating, romance, marriage, lovers, husbands, wives and in-laws, but were afraid to admit." With few exceptions, the scenes stand independent of the others but progress in a fashion designed to suggest an overall arc to relationships throughout one's life. A first date, for example, comes before scenes dealing with marriage, and scenes dealing with marriage come before those dealing with childbearing. Despite the large number of characters, the show is typically done with a comparatively small cast: the original Off-Broadway production uses a cast of four.

== Musical numbers ==
The Off-Broadway run of the show included the following musical numbers:

Act 1

- Scene 1: "Prologue"
  - "Prologue"
  - "Cantata for a First Date"
- Scene 2: "Not Tonight, I'm Busy, Busy, Busy"
  - "We Had it All" (replaced in 2018 by "Better Things To Do")
- Scene 3: "A Stud and a Babe"
  - "A Stud and a Babe"
- Scene 4: "Men Who Talk and the Women Who Pretend They're Listening"
  - "Single Man Drought"
  - "Why? 'Cause I'm a Guy"
- Scene 5: "Tear Jerk"
  - "Tear Jerk"
- Scene 6: "The Lasagna Incident"
  - "I Will Be Loved Tonight"
- Scene 7: "And Now the Parents"
  - "Hey There, Single Gal/Guy"
- Scene 8: "Satisfaction Guaranteed"
- Scene 9: "I'll Call You Soon (Yeah, Right)"
  - "He Called Me" (replaced in 2018 by "A Picture Of His...")
- Scene 10: "Scared Straight"
- Scene 11: (untitled)
  - "Cantata Reprise #1"
  - "Wedding Vows"

Act 2

- Scene 1: (untitled)
  - "Cantata Reprise #2"
  - "Always a Bridesmaid"
- Scene 2: "Whatever Happened to Baby's Parents?"
  - "The Baby Song"
- Scene 3: "Sex and the Married Couple"
  - "Marriage Tango"
- Scene 4: "The Family that Drives Together..."
  - "On the Highway of Love"
- Scene 5: "Waiting"
  - "Waiting Trio"
- Scene 6: (untitled)
  - "Shouldn't I Be Less In Love With You?"
- Scene 7: "The Very First Dating Video of Rose Ritz"
- Scene 8: "Funerals are for Dating"
  - "I Can Live With That"
- Scene 9: "Epilogue"
  - "Epilogue"
  - "I Love You, You're Perfect, Now Change"

The current licensed version available for production includes a new song in Act I, Scene 2. The song "We Had It All" was added during the Off-Broadway run and was part of several tours of the show.
