= Ragdoll (film) =

- Directed by: Ted Nicolaou
- Written by: Benjamin Carr
- Story by: Charles Band
- Produced by: Kirk Edward Hansen
- Starring: Russell Richardson; William L. Johnson; Jennifer Echols; Derrick Jones
- Cinematography: Mac Ahlberg
- Music by: Booker T. Jones III
- Production companies: Alchemy Entertainment; Full Moon Features
- Distributed by: Full Moon Features
- Release date: December 21, 1999
- Running time: 90 minutes
- Country: United States
- Language: English

Ragdoll is a 1999 American black horror film directed by Ted Nicolaou. The film was later edited into a thirty-minute short entitled Voodoo Doll for the horror anthology Devil Dolls.

== Plot ==
A teenage rapper named Kwame uses his Grandmother's ancient voodoo (magic of the killing kind) to help him in his revenge against the sadistic crime boss trying to extort his group, after he and his two brothers put her in the hospital. He summons the dark spirit known as the Shadow Man to kill the criminal and his brothers. When the Shadow Man asks Kwame what he will pay, Kwame says that he will promise him anything, except his Grandmother, or the deal is off.

The Shadow Man uses magic to give life to an old ragdoll, and sends it to kill. Kwame learns that with each death of his enemies, the ragdoll then kills someone he cares about. When his girlfriend, Tisha, is targeted, his Grandmother uses her magic to secretly trade places with Tisha. When the ragdoll comes and kills her, it breaks the deal with the Shadow Man, as Kwame said his Grandmother could not be harmed. Though Tisha is safe, Kwame mourns his dead friends and Grandmother.

== Cast ==
- Russell Richardson as Kwame
- William L. Johnson as Jean
- Jennifer Echols as Woman Detective
- Derrick Jones as Man
- Rick Michaels as Second Detective
- Freda Payne as Gran
- Jay Williams as Emcee
- Rejjie Jones as Third Detective
- Jennia Fredrique as Teesha
- Tarnell Poindexter as Mikey "Little Mikey "
- William Stanford Davis as Pere
- Danny Wooten as "Gem"
- Troy Medley as Louis
- Frederic Tucker as Shadow Man
- Lamar Haywood as Agent
- Jemal McNeil as The Bartender
- Renee O'Neil as Sylvie

== Production ==
The film was originally announced in 1992, but it did not begin pre-production until 1999. Charles Band stated that rumors that Paramount had shut down production of the film were untrue; he chose not to shoot the film, as he felt that it needed more time to develop.

== Release ==
Ragdoll was released on VHS and DVD on December 21, 1999. Ragdoll was the first release under Big City Pictures, a sub-label of Full Moon Studios specializing in urban movies featuring predominantly African American casts and crews.

== Soundtrack ==
Big City Records, a music label owned by Full Moon, released an associated soundtrack, Ragdoll: Music Inspired By The Motion Picture. This was the label's first release.

== Reception ==
Dread Central thought highly of the edited version of the film for Devil Dolls, writing "here’s a halfway decent story here and some enjoyably hammy acting bolstering it".

== Merchandising ==
A twelve inch replica of the ragdoll was released in 2000 by Full Moon Toys.

== Sequel ==
A sequel reportedly entered development in the early 2000s but didn't get past pre-production.

== In other media ==
The ragdoll appears in the fifth issue of Dollman Kills the Full Moon Universe, a crossover comic featuring Brick Bardo from Dollman tracking down different Full Moon monsters and villains to kill, published by Full Moon Comix in 2018.
