= Who Made the Potatoe Salad? =

2006 romantic comedy film by Damon Daniels

- DVD cover
- Directed by: Damon "Coke" Daniels
- Written by: Damon "Coke" Daniels
- Produced by: Steven Hirsch
- Starring: Jaleel White; Jennia Fredrique; Eddie Griffin
- Cinematography: Geary McLeod
- Edited by: Jonny Revolt; Erik Whitmyre
- Music by: Geoff Levin
- Release date: November 7, 2006
- Country: United States
- Language: English

Who Made the Potatoe Salad? is a 2006 romantic comedy film directed by Damon Daniels and starring Jaleel White and Jennia Frederique.

== Premise ==
Michael, a San Diego policeman, travels to Los Angeles for Thanksgiving with his fiancée, Ashley (played by Jennia Fredrique), to meet her dysfunctional family and announce their engagement. While there Michael is subjected to ridicule by his fiancée's father and brother for being a cop. Michael learns that his soon to be new father in law was a member of the Black Panther Party and went to prison for attempted murder of a police officer but maintains it was self defense so he hates cops.

== Cast ==
- Jaleel White as Michael
- Jennia Fredrique as Ashley Jenkins
- Clifton Powell as Jake Jenkins
- Ella Joyce as Mrs. Jenkins
- DeRay Davis as "June Bug"
- Mark Chalant Phifer as Ray "Ray-Ray"
- Daphne Bloomer as "Mookie"
- Terrance Thomas as Ray "Lil Ray"
- MC Eiht as "T-Bone"
- Reynaldo Rey as Mr. Brown
- Bebe Drake as Mrs. Brown
- Eddie Griffin as Malik
- Tommy Lister as "Mr. Monster"
- Gary Owen as Police Officer
- Michael Colyar as Old Man #1 In Park
