= The Thing About Men =

- Playbill Logo
- Music: Jimmy Roberts
- Lyrics: Joe DiPietro
- Book: Joe DiPietro
- Productions: 2003 Off-Broadway Production

The Thing About Men is a musical with music by Jimmy Roberts and lyrics and book by Joe DiPietro. It is based on the 1985 German film Men... by Doris Dörrie but resets the action from Germany to New Jersey and New York. The plot revolves around a love triangle and shows what men will do to keep their pride and love affairs intact.

== Productions ==
=== Off-Broadway ===
The show opened Off-Broadway at the Promenade Theatre on August 23, 2003 following previews from August 6. It closed on February 15, 2004 after playing more than 200 performances. The cast featured Marc Kudisch, (who originated the role of the cuckolded and philandering husband, Tom), Jennifer Simard (Greek chorus), Daniel Reichard (Greek chorus), Ron Bohmer (Sebastian) and Leah Hocking (Lucy). Graham Rowat played the final week of the run as Tom. The musical was directed by Mark Clements with musical staging by Rob Ashford. Lighting design by Ken Billington.

=== London ===
The musical played at the King's Head Theatre in London from April 30, 2007, following previews from April 25, 2007. The limited six week season ended on June 3, 2007. The production was directed by Anthony Drewe and the cast included Hal Fowler, Tim Rogers and Paul Baker.

In 2012 The Thing About Men played at the Landor Theatre, London; directed by Andrew Keates and featured John Addison, Lucyelle Cliffe, Peter Gerald, Kate Graham and Steven Webb.

== Song list ==
- Opening/Oh, What a Man! — Tom, Lucy, Man & Woman
- No Competition for Me - Tom, Taxi Driver
- Opportunity Knocking — Tom
- Free, Easy Guy — Sebastian, Lucy
- Free, Easy Guy (Reprise) - Tom
- Take Me Into You — Sebastian, Lucy
- Because - Lucy
- The Confession - Priest
- The Greatest Friend — Sebastian, Tom
- Downtown Bohemian Slum — Company
- You Will Never Get Into This Restaurant - Maitre'd
- Me, Too - Sebastian, Cindy, Waiter, Tom
- One-Woman Man - Sebastian, Cindy, Waiter, Tom
- Take Me Into You (Reprise) - Lucy
- Highway of Your Heart - Country Singer
- The Better Man Won - Tom
- The Road to Lucy - Tom, Sebastian, Lucy
- Make Me a Promise, Thomas - Tom, Lucy
- New, Beautiful Man - Tom, Sebastian, Stylist
- Time to Go Home - Tom
- Finale/You Can Have It All — Company

== Awards and nominations ==
- 2004 Drama Desk Award, Outstanding Featured Actress in a Musical, Simard (nomination)
- 2004 Outer Critics Circle Award, Best Off-Broadway Musical (win)
