= Jennia Fredrique =

American writer, director and actor

- Born: Gary, Indiana
- Occupations: film director, screenwriter, actor
- Known for: Who Made the Potato Salad?

Jennia Fredrique Aponte is an American writer, director and actor known for the films Who Made the Potato Salad?, First Kiss in Color, Sacred Heart (2015) and 90 Days (2017). The latter, a film about HIV, earned Aponte numerous awards including an African Academy Award.

== Biography ==
Born November 4, 1975, in Gary, Indiana, Aponte studied film and theater at Columbia College Chicago, before moving to Los Angeles to embark on a career in front of the camera prior to writing and directing. As an actress, she has held recurring and series regular roles on: Noah’s Arc (Logo), City Guys (NBC), Delores and Jermaine with Whoopi Goldberg (ABC), According to Him & Her (BET), Passions (NBC), My Wife and Kids (ABC), Cuts (CW) and The Hughley's (CW).

In 1999, Aponte starred in the movie Ragdoll with Russell Richardson as the character Teesha.

In 2015, Aponte and her husband Sol Aponte wrote and produced the short film titled Sacred Heart.

In 2016, Aponte became co-director for the film 90 Days with writer and co-director Nathan Hale Williams. In, 2020 she created and starred in the television movie Anatomy of Black Love with her husband Sol Aponte on Revolt's platform.

In 2017, Aponte created and starred in the film Letter To Heaven.

Aponte has also written and directed, along with her husband and producing partner, Sol Aponte, the Anatomy series, a six-part docuseries for P. Diddy Combs's REVOLT TV.

== Works ==
=== Film ===
- Ragdoll (film) (1999), had the role of Teesha
- Who Made the Potatoe Salad? (2006), had the role of Ashley
- Noah's Arc: Jumping the Broom (2008), had the role of Brandy
- Letter To Heaven (2017), had the role of Ms. Watson (as Jennia Fredrique)
- Revolt’s Anatomy of Black Love (2020), had the role of Herself

=== Television ===
- Cuts (TV series) (2005), as a guest star
- Noah's Arc (2005–2006), as Brandy King, a series regular
- Half & Half (2002–2003), as a guest star
- One on One (TV series) (2002), as a guest star
- City Guys (1999–2001), as a guest star
- The Hughleys (2001), as a guest star
- Girlfriends (2000 TV series) (2001), as a guest star
