= Jimmy Roberts (composer) =

American composer, pianist and entertainer

Jimmy Roberts is an American composer for the musical theater as well as a pianist and entertainer. His musical scores include: I Love You, You're Perfect, Now Change (1996) and The Thing About Men (2003), both with book and lyrics by Joe DiPietro. He is a 1977 graduate of the Manhattan School of Music, where he studied with the noted pianist, Constance Keene.

== Works and recognition ==
"I Love You, You're Perfect, Now Change," nominated for Best Musical by both the Outer Critics Circle and the Drama Desk, became the second-longest running Off Broadway musical in theater history (6,000 performances), and was translated into numerous languages, including Chinese, Korean, Spanish, German, French, Catalan, Hebrew, Czech, Romanian and Hungarian. "The Thing About Men" was voted Best Musical of the 2003/2004 season, by the New York Outer Critics Circle. His children's musical, "The Velveteen Rabbit" (1986, book and lyrics by James Still), toured the United States for a decade, and he contributed individual songs to two other Off Broadway revues, "A . . . My Name is Still Alice" and "Pets!" (lyrics by June Siegel). He also composed "The Truth About Light" (2007) with British playwright/lyricist Warner Brown. That show has not yet been produced.

Among his compositions are two commissioned works: "The Heart of the Matter" (2008), with words by poet Dana Gioia, performed at the Guggenheim Museum, New York; and "I Sing, I Pray" (2007), written for Cantor Roslyn Barak, Congregation Emanu-El, San Francisco. Mr. Roberts also created and performed special piano arrangements for the Grand Piano Marathon at Merkin Concert Hall (2008), and gave a lecture/demonstration at the Newark School of the Arts for the Leonard Bernstein 90th birthday celebration.

As a pianist and performer, Jimmy Roberts devises programs that blend classical and popular music (including Gershwin and Broadway), comedy and song. He has appeared at Merkin Concert Hall, the Time Warner Center, the 92nd Street Y, Steinway Hall and the "Music at Meyer" series in San Francisco. He was guest artist at the Newark School of the Arts in New Jersey, the Cab Calloway School of the Arts, in Wilmington, Delaware, and St. Francis College (Brooklyn). In the summer of 2010, he was guest artist at the inaugural season of the Buck Hill/Skytop Music Festival in Pennsylvania.

The original cast recordings for his shows were recorded on the following record labels: "I Love You, You’re Perfect, Now Change" (Varese-Sarabande Records); "The Thing About Men" (DRG Records). Both shows are administered by The Rodgers and Hammerstein Organization.

His newest musical, “Welcome to the Big Dipper,” written with librettists Catherine Filloux and John Daggett is slated for production in New York during the 2024/2025 season.

== Personal life ==
Jimmy Roberts was born in 1952 in New York City but was raised in the town of Great Neck, NY. He graduated from John. L. Miller Great Neck North High School in the Class of 1970. Jimmy's grandfather was a cantor and rabbi and his grandmother played organ and piano.
