= Karen Rosenfelt =

American film and television producer

- Education: Claremont McKenna College
- Occupation: Film producer
- Father: Frank Rosenfelt
- Relatives: David Rosenfelt (cousin)

Karen Rosenfelt is American media proprietor, film producer and television producer. She received production credits on the Twilight and Percy Jackson film franchises, as well as the 2006 film The Devil Wears Prada. She has also served as a studio executive for films including Book Thief and Me Before You, as well as the Max and Alvin and the Chipmunks film franchises.

She is the daughter of Frank Edward Rosenfelt, who was the CEO of MGM in the 1970s–80s and United Artists after the acquisition by MGM. She is the cousin of ex Tri-Star Pictures president of marketing turned book author David Rosenfelt. Her films in total have grossed over $6.48 billion at the worldwide box office as of 2023. In September 2022, her and John Goldwyn formed the company Goldwyn/Rosenfelt Productions to sign a first-look television deal with Warner Bros Television.

== Early life and early career ==
Rosenfelt graduated from Beverly Hills High School in 1976. After attending Claremont McKenna College she graduated in 1980 and immediately jumped into the entertainment business. Her first job out of school was at ICM where she was the assistant to talent agent Sue Mengers. She then went on to work for Jerry Weintraub Productions (Weintraub Entertainment Group) where she was the assistant to then chairman. From there she became a creative executive then eventually vice president of the company.

== Studio executive career ==
Rosenfelt entered the studio world when she was appointed senior vice president of production at MGM in early February 1990. After the brief stint she moved to Paramount Pictures where she was named the senior vice president of production in late August 1990. In 2002 she became the co-president of production and is credited with serving as a liaison between Paramount and its sister labels, Nickelodeon Movies and MTV films. She set up Paramount's partnership with Nickelodeon Movies, overseeing film adaptations of Nickelodeon Television's IP such as the Rugrats and SpongeBob SquarePants. Over her 15-year career at Paramount, she oversaw live-action and animated features such as The First Wives Club, Indecent Proposal, Runaway Bride, Save the Last Dance, The Rugrats Movie, The SpongeBob SquarePants Movie, Lemony Snicket's A Series of Unfortunate Events, Coach Carter, and Mean Girls just to name a few. This all came to a stop in April 2005 when Paramount reshuffled its executive ranks. Rosenfelt and fellow co-president Tom Jacobson was caught in the midst.

== Producing career ==
Following her departure from the studio, Rosenfelt became an independent producer, producing under the Sunswept Entertainment banner, a production company which she founded. In November 2005 she signed an exclusive production deal with Fox 2000 Pictures and Twentieth Century Fox. She is one of twenty women in Hollywood who has a first look deal with a major Hollywood studio.

Under this banner throughout the years Rosenfelt has produced films under various studios. She produced the Twilight, Alvin and the Chipmunks, Max, and Percy Jackson franchises as well as The Devil Wears Prada, Me Before You, Marley & Me, Yogi Bear, The Big Year, The Book Thief, Wonder Park, and the New Mutants, among others. In 2006, The Devil Wears Prada was nominated for a Golden Globe in Best Picture- Musical or Comedy. Her films have grossed a total of over $6.48 billion at the box office making her one of the world's highest grossing producers working today. On the TV side she's produced The First Wives Club, Dare Me, Dopesick, and The Summer I Turned Pretty. In 2022 Dopesick was nominated for an Emmy in Outstanding Limited or Anthology Series along with 13 other nominations.

In September 2022 Rosenfelt and former Paramount colleague John Goldwyn- from the famed Goldwyn family- formed a new production company, Goldwyn/Rosenfelt Productions. They signed a first-look television deal with Warner Bros Television. Their deal encompasses producing original scripted programming for the studio's internal portfolio, including HBO Max, as well as outside streaming services, cable, and broadcast networks.
