= Jeanna de Waal =

British actress

- Born: Germany
- Occupation: Actress
- Years active: 2010-present

Jeanna de Waal is a British stage actress and singer. She is known for playing the title role of Princess Diana in the 2021 Broadway show Diana: The Musical, which was also released on Netflix. The musical received mostly negative reviews from critics and won five Golden Raspberry Awards, including Worst Actress for de Waal. However, De Waal was also nominated for a Drama Desk Award for Outstanding Actress in a Musical for the same role.

De Waal was born in Germany and raised in England. In 2012, she portrayed Glinda in the national tour of Wicked. She moved to New York City at the age of 22, where her Broadway appearances included Heather in American Idiot (2010) and Lauren in Kinky Boots (2014). In 2014 and 2015, she originated the roles of Dawn in Waitress and Mary Barrie in Finding Neverland at the American Repertory Theater. De Waal was cast as the standby for Mrs. Lovett and the Beggar Woman in the 2023 Broadway revival of Sweeney Todd: The Demon Barber of Fleet Street, and performed the role of Mrs Lovett from 17 January to 7 February 2024, between the stints of Annaleigh Ashford and Sutton Foster. In August 2024, she played Reno Sweeney in Anything Goes at The Muny. In August 2025, De Waal portrayed Myrtle Wilson in the Asian premiere of The Great Gatsby in Seoul, South Korea.

In 2017, de Waal and her sister founded Broadway Weekends, a theater summer camp for adults.

== Awards ==
Year	Category	Nominated work	Result	Ref.
2021	Golden Raspberry Award for Worst Actress	Diana: The Musical	Won	
2022	Drama Desk Award for Outstanding Actress in a Musical	Diana: The Musical	Nominated	
