= Romar Entertainment =

California-based film distribution company

Roman Entertainment
- Founded: 2003
- Key people: James Schramm; Billy Zane

Romar Entertainment was a California-based film distribution company founded in 2003 by James Schramm, and partnered with Billy Zane in 2005.

== Lawsuit ==
In 2008 the company was the subject of a lawsuit by film maker Uwe Boll. Boll claimed Romar had failed to properly promote his 2005 adaptation of a video game, BloodRayne, directly resulting in the poor box-office performance of the film.

== Filmography ==
=== Distribution ===
- Ancient Warriors (2003)
- Vlad (2003)
- Fish Without a Bicycle (2003)
- The Helix...Loaded (2005)
- BloodRayne (2005)

=== Production ===
- No Names (2007)
