= Duncan Henderson =

American film producer (1949–2022)

- Born: Duncan Scott Henderson; July 19, 1949; Culver City, California, U.S.
- Died: June 21, 2022 (aged 72); Valencia, California, U.S.
- Occupations: Film producer, assistant director, production manager
- Notable work: Master and Commander: The Far Side of the World; Oblivion; Rocky IV
- Spouse: Michele P. Henderson
- Children: 4

Duncan Scott Henderson (July 19, 1949 – June 21, 2022) was an American film producer, assistant director, and production manager. He produced the 2003 film Master and Commander: The Far Side of the World, which earned him an Academy Award nomination in the category Best Picture. Henderson had shared the nomination with Samuel Goldwyn Jr. and Peter Weir. In 2020, he received the Frank Capra Achievement Award.

Henderson was born and raised in Culver City, California. He attended film school at the University of California, Los Angeles, and business school at the University of Southern California. He died of pancreatic cancer on June 21, 2022, at the age of 72.

== Filmography ==
Producer

- Master and Commander: The Far Side of the World (2003)
- Poseidon (2006)
- The Way Back (2010)
- Oblivion (2013)
- Ben-Hur (2016)
- Maleficent: Mistress of Evil (2019)
- Space Jam: A New Legacy (2021)
- Transformers: Rise of the Beasts (2023)

Co-producer

- Taking Care of Business (1990)
- Green Card (1990)
- Dying Young (1991)

Executive producer

- Home Alone 2: Lost in New York (1992)
- The Program (1993)
- Outbreak (1995)
- Deep Blue Sea (1999)
- The Perfect Storm (2000)
- Harry Potter and the Philosopher's Stone (2001)
- G-Force (2009)
