= Coke Daniels =

American filmmaker

Damon "Coke" Daniels is an American film director, screenwriter and film producer. He wrote and co-produced the 2004 Miramax film My Baby's Daddy. He also wrote, produced and directed the 2021 film Karen, starring Taryn Manning and Cory Hardrict. In 2024, he wrote and directed the emotionally charged drama The Waterboyz, starring Omar Dorsey, Quavo, and La La Anthony, in which he won Best Director at the 2024 American Black Film Festival. Coke released his new movie CONTENT in partnership with Hartbeat Productions on Tubi "CONTENT" released in Sept 2026 featuring Justina Valentine.

== Filmography ==
Year	Film	Director	Writer	Producer
2004	My Baby's Daddy	No	Yes	Yes
2006	Who Made the Potatoe Salad?	Yes	Yes	No
2007	Gangsta Rap: The Glockumentary	Yes	Yes	Yes
2009	Busted	Yes	No	Yes
2012	Highway	Yes	Yes	Yes
2013	Parking Lot Pimpin'	Yes	Yes	Yes
2013	Hollywont	Yes	No	No
2019	His, Hers & the Truth	Yes	Yes	Yes
2021	Fruits of the Heart	Yes	Yes	Yes
2021	Karen	Yes	Yes	Yes
2024	The Waterboyz	Yes	Yes	Yes
2026	CONTENT	Yes	Yes	Yes
