= Sevier Crespo =

American film and television producer (born 1976)

Sevier Ommy Crespo (born April 26, 1976) is an American film and television producer, actor, and writer.

== Early life and career ==
A native of Mayagüez, Puerto Rico, Crespo spent his formative years in Dallas, Texas. After studying at the KD Conservatory in Dallas, Crespo relocated to Los Angeles to pursue a career in acting. Following work on television shows such as NYPD Blue, Crespo became interested in the production side of the entertainment business, and he studied production at UCLA. Films produced by Crespo have screened at Cannes and his work has included such actors as Lucy Hale, Taryn Manning, Danny Trejo, Steven Bauer, and Johnathan Schaech.

== Selected filmography ==
Year	Title	Role	Notes
2001	NYPD Blue	actor	Episode: "Lies Like A Rug"
2001	Spyder Games	actor	Episode: "#1.49"
2006	TV: The Movie	actor	
2009	Tom Cool	actor	
2010	Jackers	producer/writer/actor	
2013	Pandejo	producer/actor	Winner: Best American Comedy, NYC International Film Festival
2013	The Stafford Project	producer/actor	Series regular, 10 episodes
2013	Absence	line producer	
2014	Switched At Birth	actor	Episode: "Fountain"
2015	The Culling	line producer/co-producer	
2015	Mi Princesa	line producer/actor	
2018	In A Silent Way	producer	
2019	El Guardia	producer/line producer	
2021	Karen	producer	
2021	Borrego	consulting producer	
