= 43rd Golden Raspberry Awards =

Award ceremony for worst in film in 2022

- Awarded for: Worst in film
- Date: March 10, 2023
- Site: Los Angeles, California

Highlights
- Worst Picture: Blonde
- Most awards: Blonde / Elvis / Morbius (2)
- Most nominations: Blonde (8)

The 43rd Golden Raspberry Awards, or Razzies, honored the worst the film industry had to offer in 2022 on March 10, 2023. The awards are based on votes from members of the Golden Raspberry Foundation. The nominations were announced on January 22, 2023. The biographical psychological drama Blonde received the most nominations with eight, including Worst Picture and Worst Director (Andrew Dominik), winning the former and Worst Screenplay (Dominik).

The Worst Actress nomination of then twelve-year-old Ryan Kiera Armstrong for her performance in the Firestarter remake was the subject of backlash, following which Razzies co-founder John J. B. Wilson issued a public apology and announced that the organization would no longer allow children to be nominated in any category, placing itself in Armstrong's place on the ballot.

== Winners and nominees ==
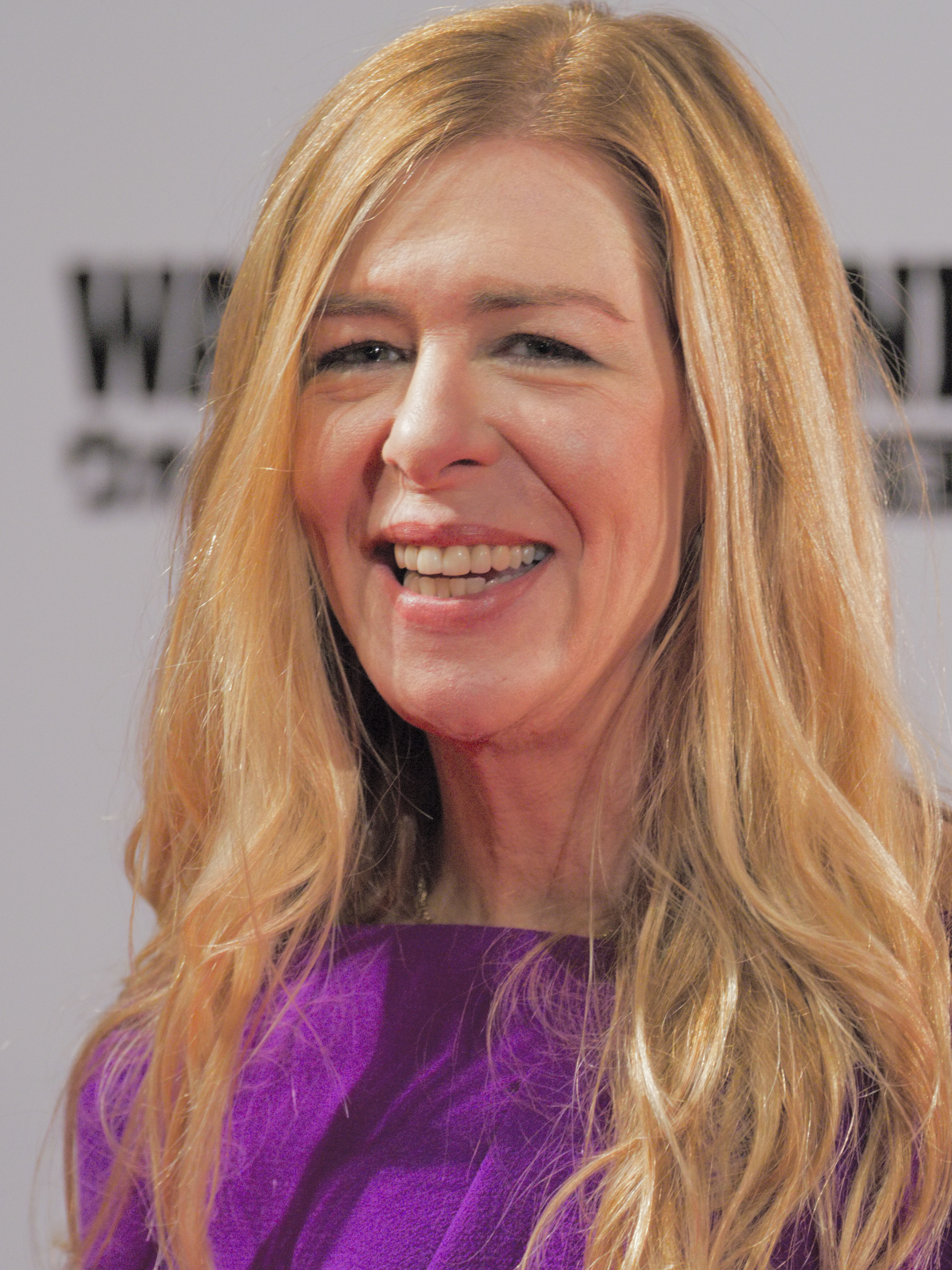
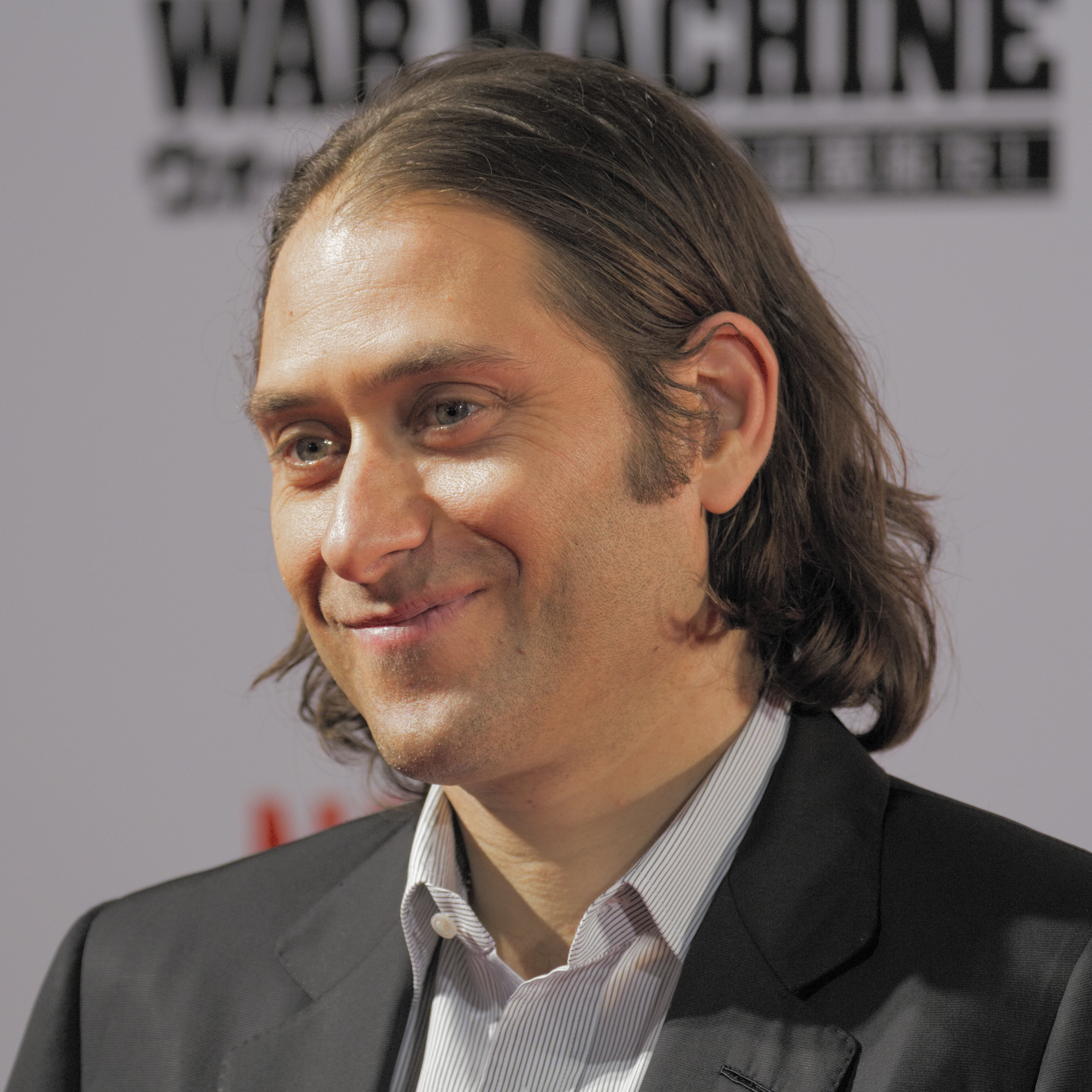
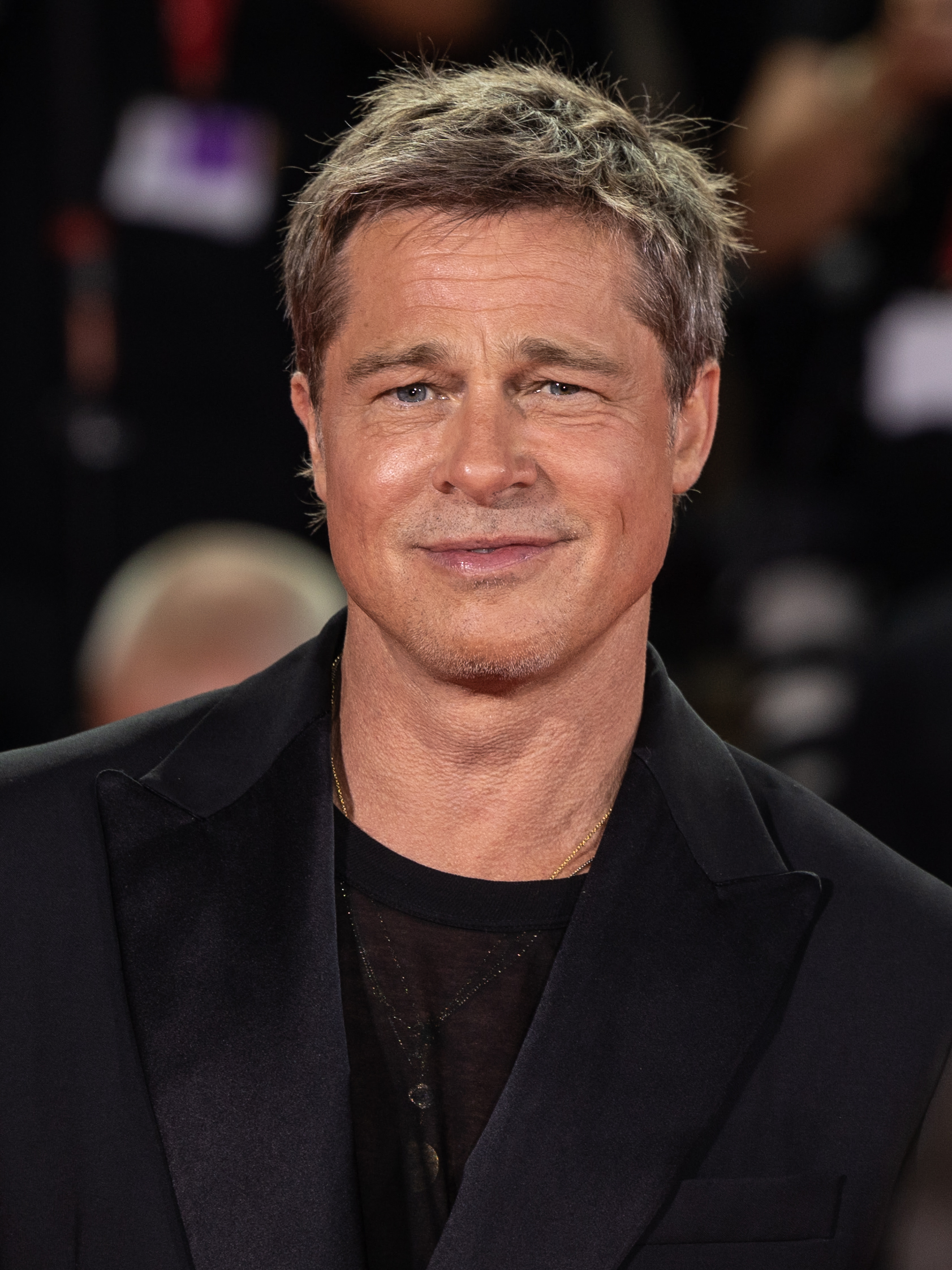
Dede Gardner, Jeremy Kleiner and Brad Pitt, Worst Picture co-winners
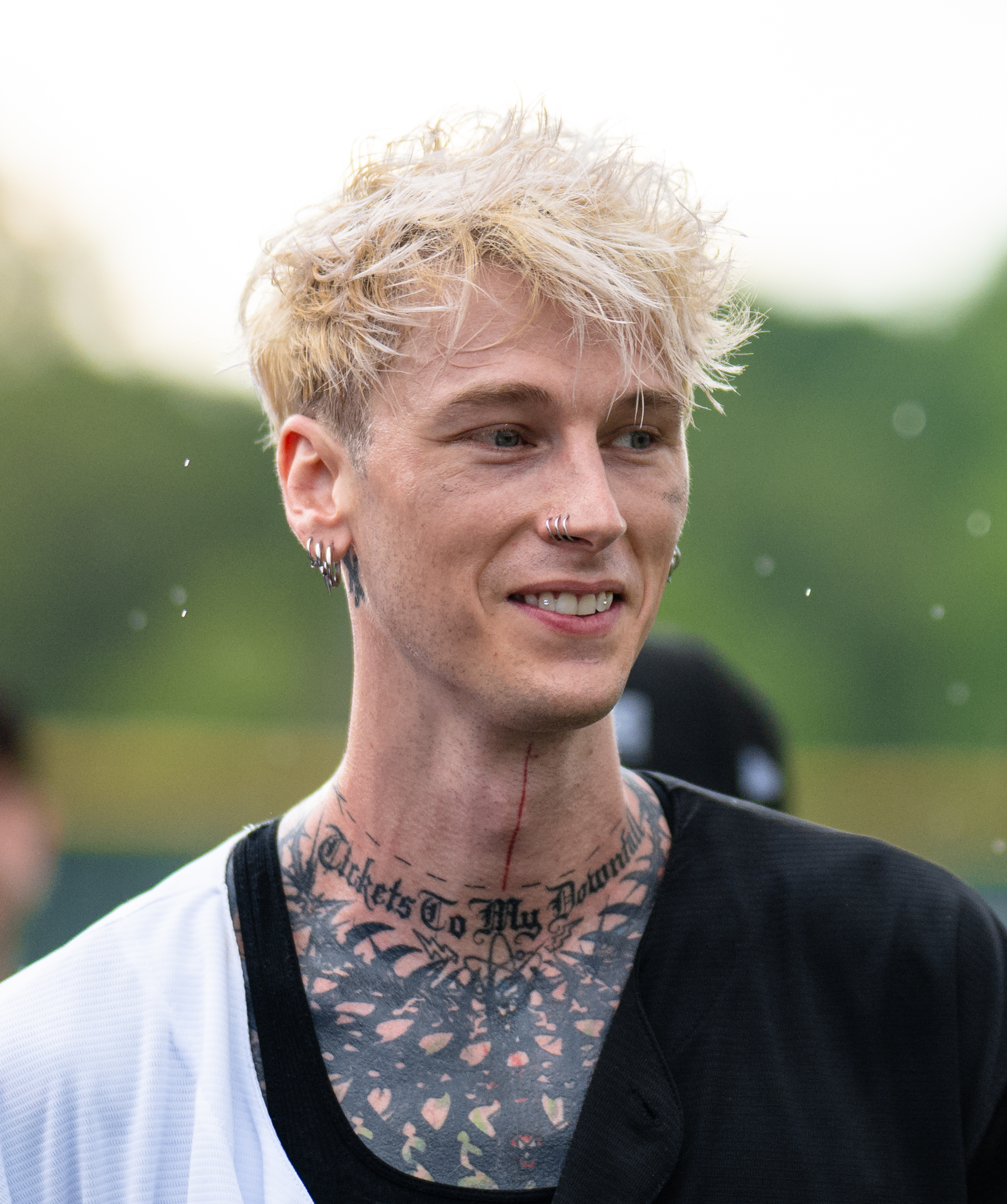
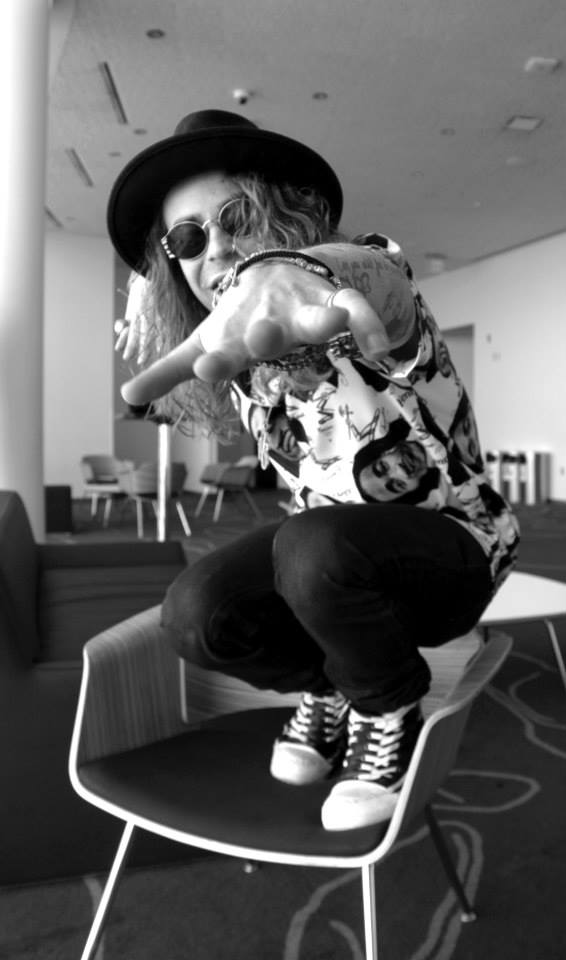
Colson Baker (aka Machine Gun Kelly) and Mod Sun, Worst Director winners

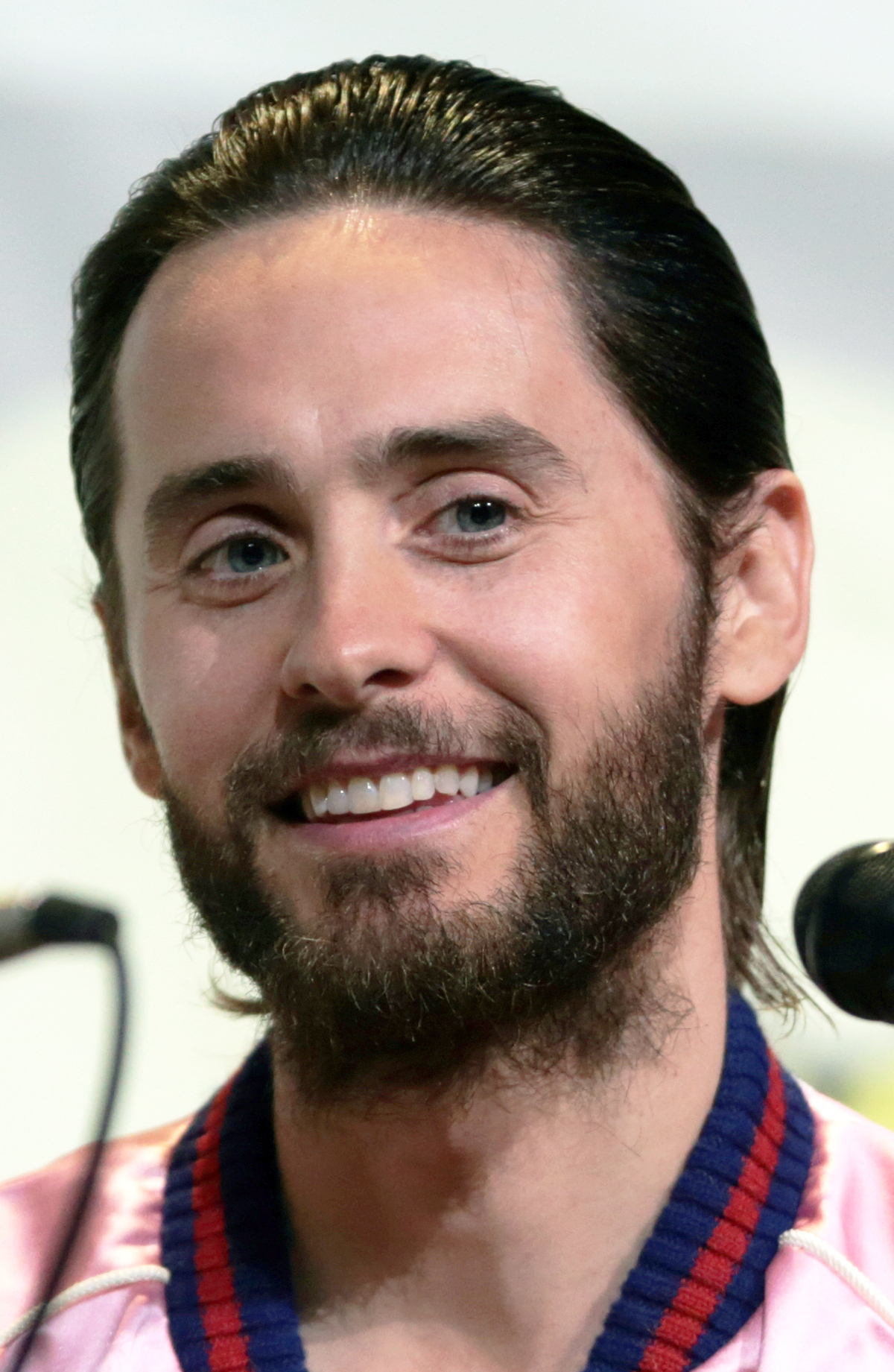
Jared Leto, Worst Actor winner

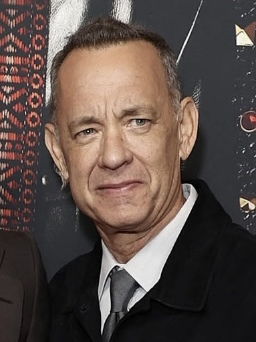
Tom Hanks, Worst Supporting Actor winner and Worst Screen Combo co-winner

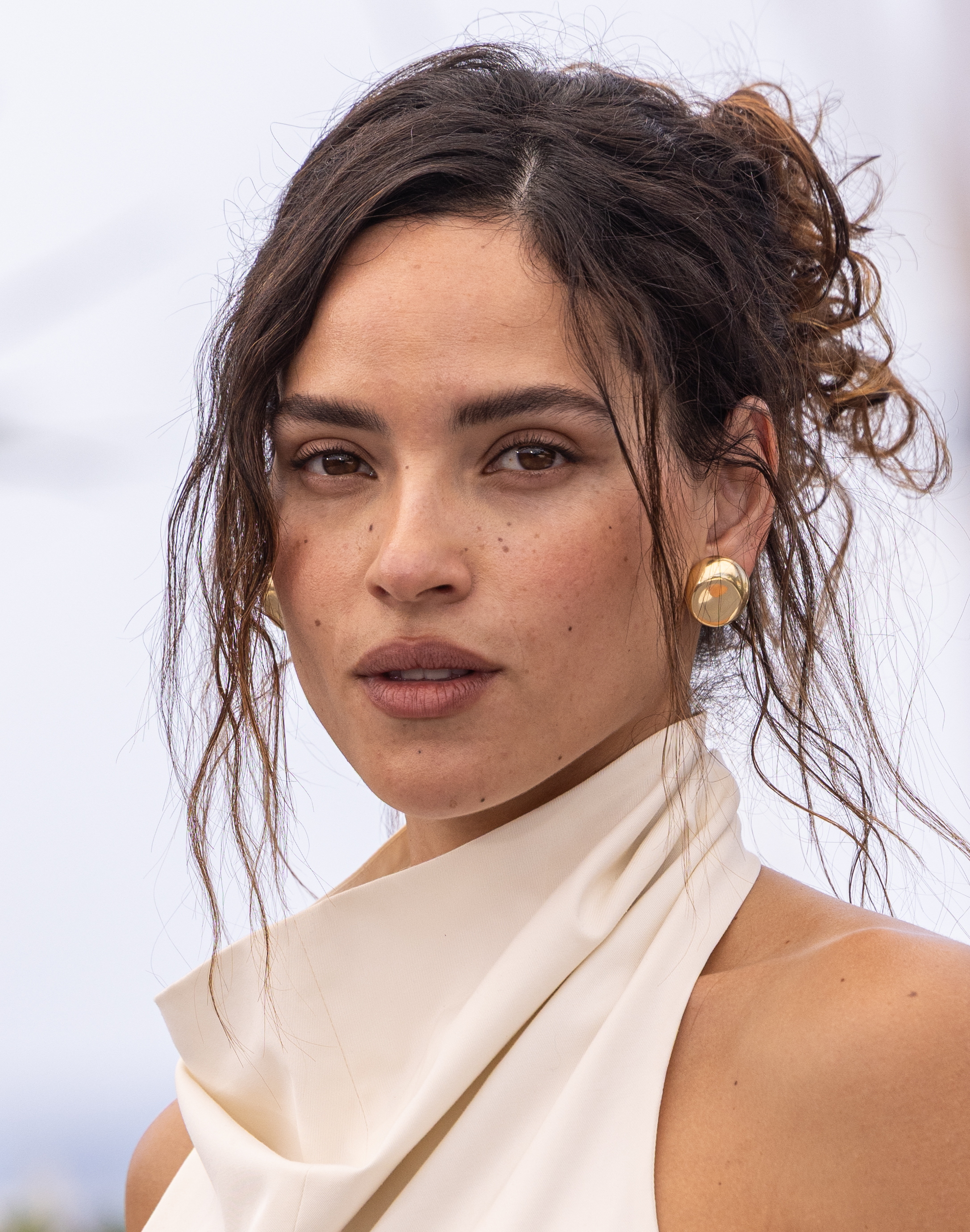
Adria Arjona, Worst Supporting Actress winner

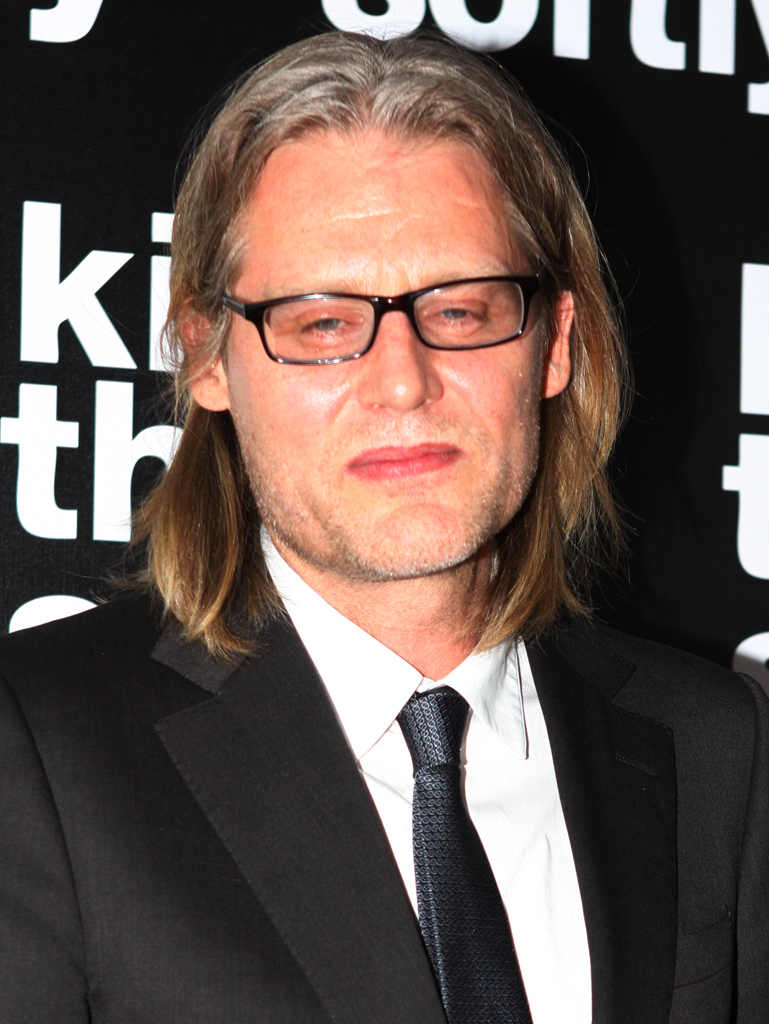
Andrew Dominik, Worst Screenplay winner

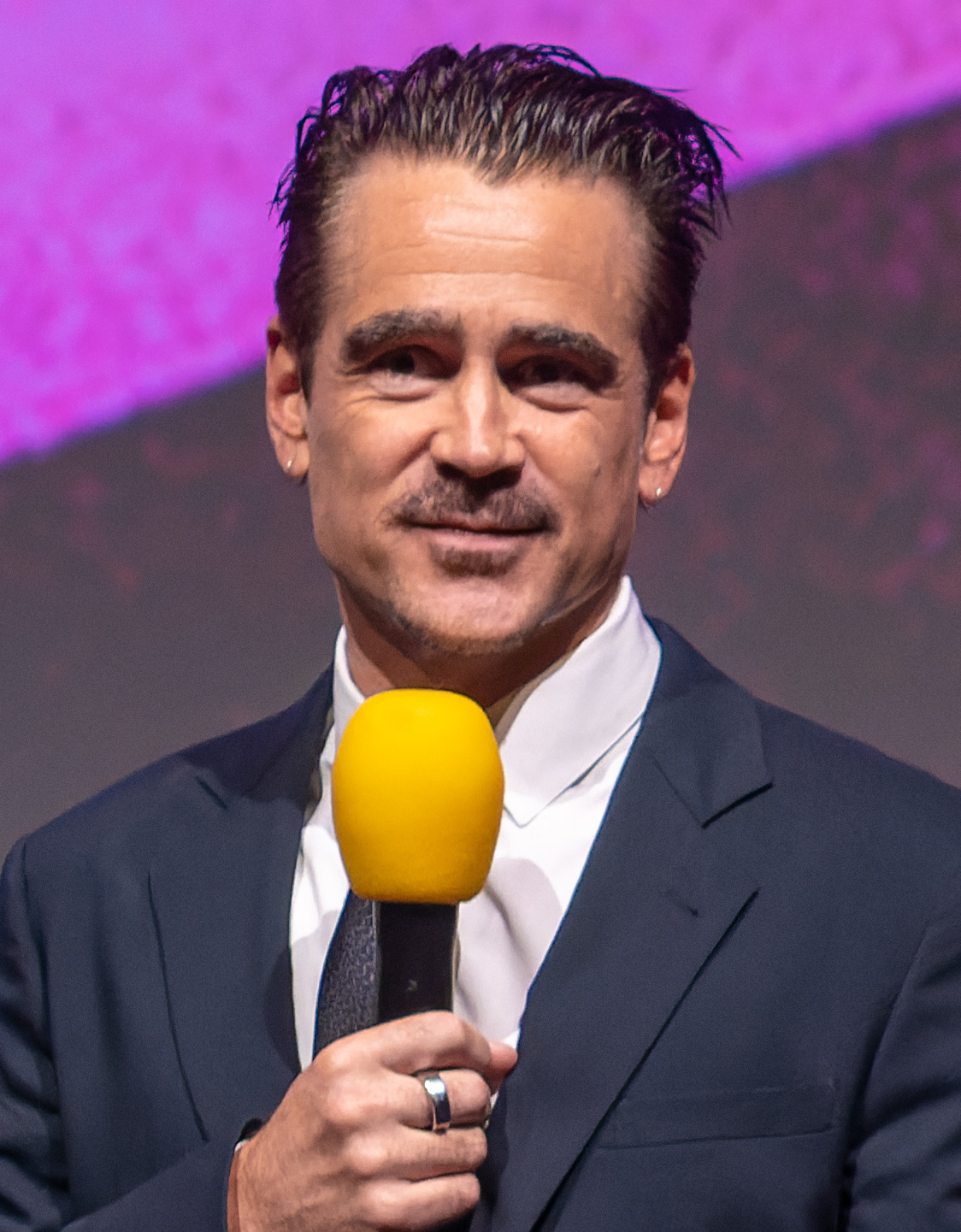
Colin Farrell, Razzie Redeemer Award winner

Worst Picture: Blonde (Netflix) – Dede Gardner, Jeremy Kleiner, Tracey Landon, Brad Pitt, and Scott Robertson; Disney's Pinocchio (Disney+) – Derek Hogue, Andrew Milano, Chris Weitz, and Robert Zemeckis; Good Mourning (Open Road Films) – Colson Baker (aka Machine Gun Kelly), Chris Long, Jib Polhemus, and Mod Sun; The King's Daughter (Gravitas Ventures) – David Brookwell, Paul Currie, Wei Han, James Pang Hong, and Sean McNamara; Morbius (Columbia) – Avi Arad, Lucas Foster, and Matt Tolmach	Worst Director: Colson Baker (aka Machine Gun Kelly) and Mod Sun – Good Mourning; Judd Apatow – The Bubble; Andrew Dominik – Blonde; Daniel Espinosa – Morbius; Robert Zemeckis – Disney's Pinocchio
Worst Actor: Jared Leto – Morbius as Dr. Michael Morbius; Colson Baker (aka Machine Gun Kelly) – Good Mourning as London Clash; Pete Davidson – Marmaduke as Marmaduke (voice only); Tom Hanks – Disney's Pinocchio as Geppetto; Sylvester Stallone – Samaritan as Joe Smith / Samaritan / Nemesis	Worst Actress: The Razzies (for "Their 43rd Worst Actress Nominations Blunder"); ~~Ryan Kiera Armstrong – Firestarter as Charlene "Charlie" McGee~~ (Note: Nomination rescinded); Bryce Dallas Howard – Jurassic World Dominion as Claire Dearing; Diane Keaton – Mack & Rita as Mackenzie "Mack" Martin / "Rita"; Kaya Scodelario – The King's Daughter as Marie-Josèphe; Alicia Silverstone – The Requin as Jaelyn
Worst Supporting Actor: Tom Hanks – Elvis as Colonel Tom Parker; Pete Davidson – Good Mourning as Berry; Xavier Samuel – Blonde as Cass Chaplin; Mod Sun – Good Mourning as Dylan; Evan Williams – Blonde as Eddy Robinson Jr.	Worst Supporting Actress: Adria Arjona – Morbius as Martine Bancroft; Fan Bingbing – The 355 and The King's Daughter as Lin Mi Sheng and The Mermaid; Lorraine Bracco – Disney's Pinocchio as Sofia (voice only); Penélope Cruz – The 355 as Graciela Rivera; Mira Sorvino – Lamborghini: The Man Behind the Legend as Annita
Worst Screen Combo: Tom Hanks and his latex-laden face (and that ludicrous accent) – Elvis; Colson Baker (aka Machine Gun Kelly) and Mod Sun – Good Mourning; Both real life characters (Marilyn Monroe and John F. Kennedy) in the fallacious White House bedroom scene – Blonde; Andrew Dominik and his issues with women – Blonde; The two 365 Days sequels (both released in 2022)	Worst Remake, Rip-off or Sequel: Disney's Pinocchio (NOT del Toro's!) (Disney+); Blonde (Netflix) (Note: Considered a remake of Blonde, a 2001 CBS TV film); BOTH 365 Days Sequels – 365 Days: This Day & The Next 365 Days [a Razzie BOGO] (Netflix); Firestarter (Universal); Jurassic World Dominion (Universal)
Worst Screenplay: Blonde – written for the screen by Andrew Dominik; adapted from the "bio-novel" by Joyce Carol Oates; Disney's Pinocchio – screenplay by Robert Zemeckis and Chris Weitz; based on the 1940 Disney animated film and novel The Adventures of Pinocchio by Carlo Collodi (Not Authorized by the Estate of Carlo Collodi); Good Mourning – "written" by Machine Gun Kelly and Mod Sun; Jurassic World Dominion – screenplay by Emily Carmichael and Colin Trevorrow; story by Trevorrow and Derek Connolly; Morbius – screen story and screenplay by Matt Sazama and Burk Sharpless; based on the Marvel Comics character by Gil Kane and Roy Thomas	Razzie Redeemer Award: Colin Farrell (from 2004 Worst Actor nominee to 2022 Best Actor Oscar Front-Runner); Val Kilmer (from The Island of Dr. Moreau to Val); Mark Wahlberg (from Transformers: The Last Knight to Father Stu)

== Films with multiple wins and nominations ==
The following films received multiple nominations:

Films with multiple nominations
Nominations	Film
8	Blonde
7	Good Mourning
6	Disney's Pinocchio
5	Morbius
3	Jurassic World Dominion
3	The King's Daughter
2	The 355
2	365 Days: This Day
2	Elvis
2	The Next 365 Days

The following films received multiple wins:

Films with multiple wins
Wins	Film
2	Blonde
2	Elvis
2	Morbius
