= 41st Golden Raspberry Awards =

Award ceremony for worst in film in 2020

- Awarded for: Worst in film
- Date: April 24, 2021
- Site: Los Angeles, California

Highlights
- Worst Picture: Absolute Proof
- Most awards: Music (3)
- Most nominations: 365 Days and Dolittle (6)

The 41st Golden Raspberry Awards, or Razzies, was an awards ceremony that identified the worst the film industry had to offer in 2020, along with the first two months of 2021, according to votes from members of the Golden Raspberry Foundation. Razzies co-founder John J. B. Wilson has claimed that the intent of the awards is "to be funny". It took place on April 24, 2021. The nominees were announced on March 12, 2021.

The COVID-19 pandemic and subsequent cinema closings, combined with the example set by other contemporary award shows (particularly the Academy Awards), resulted in streaming media being valid for nominations for the first time. Absolute Proof became the second documentary film to be awarded Worst Picture, winning both Razzies it was nominated for; the other being Worst Actor for Mike Lindell.

Nominated for Worst Supporting Actress for Hillbilly Elegy, Glenn Close became the third person to have received both Oscar and Razzie acting nominations for the same role.

== Winners and nominees ==
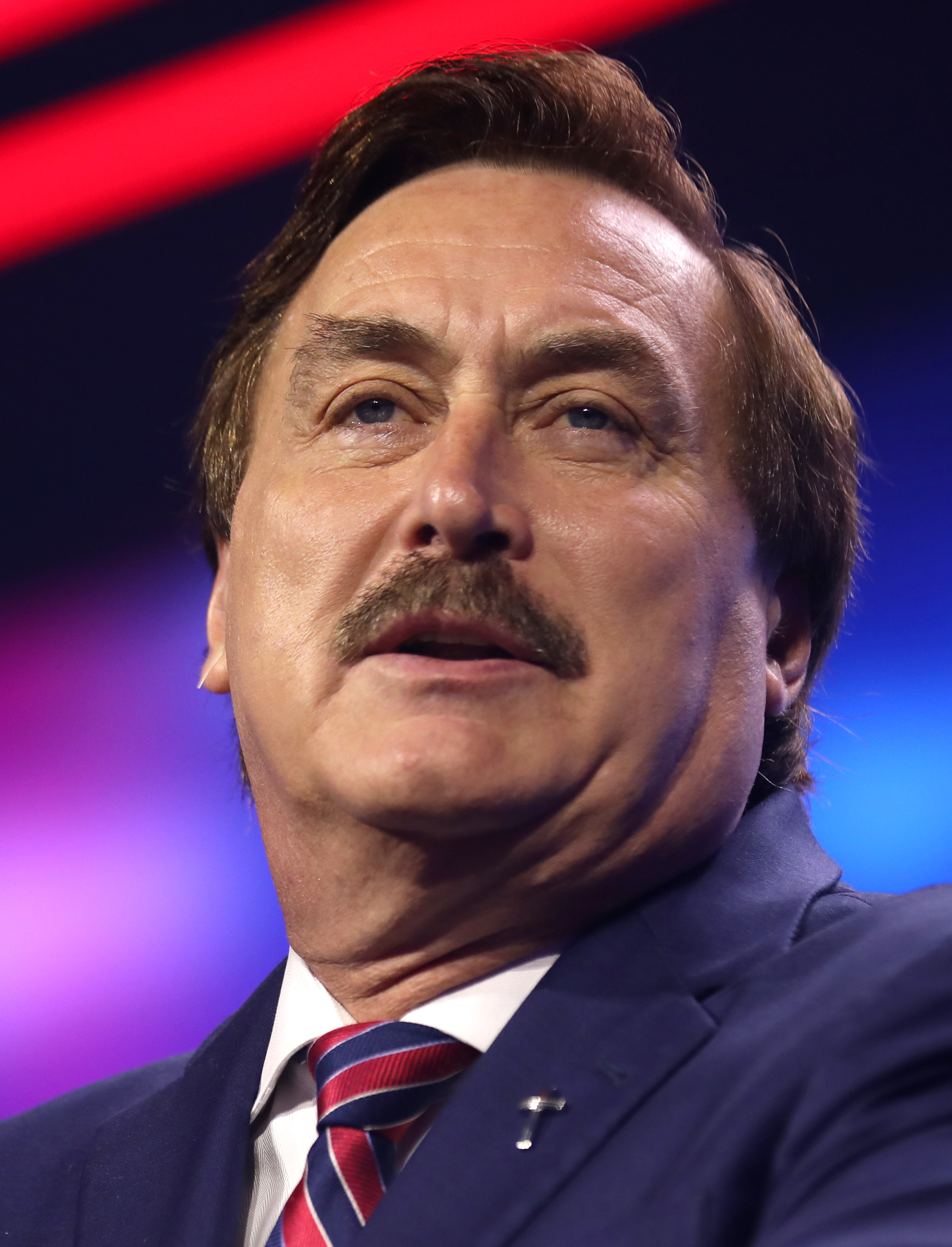
Mike Lindell, Worst Picture co-winner and Worst Actor winner

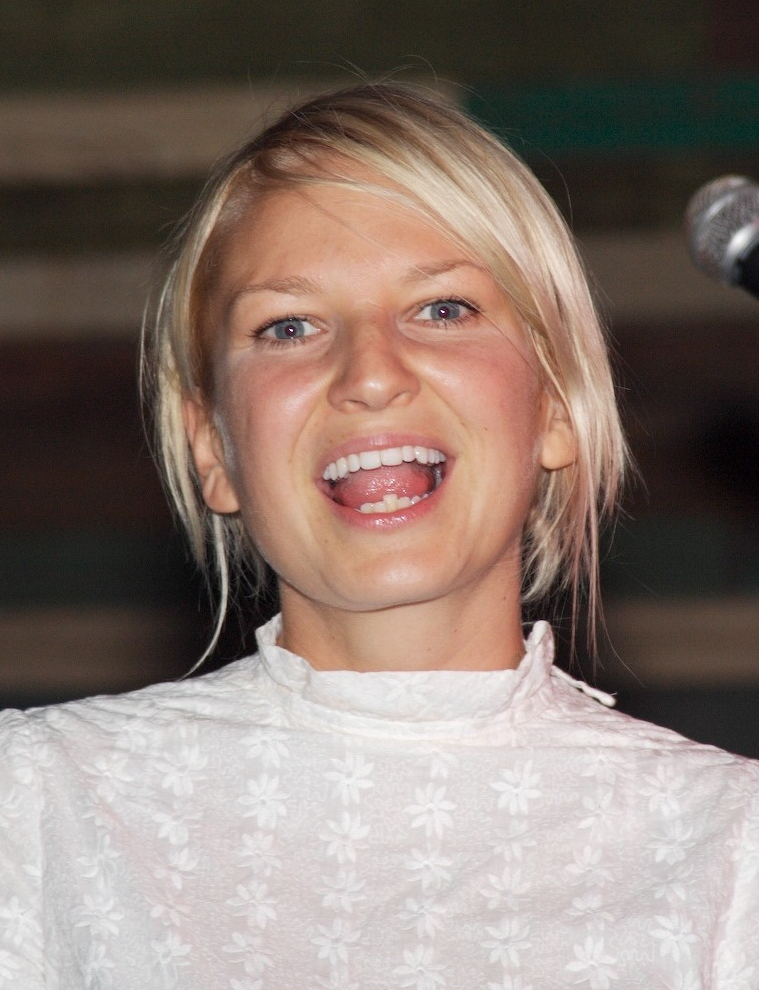
Sia, Worst Director winner

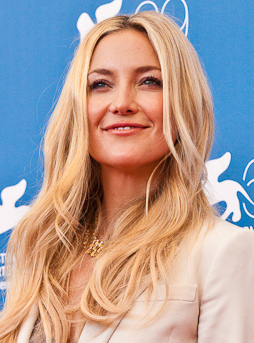
Kate Hudson, Worst Actress winner

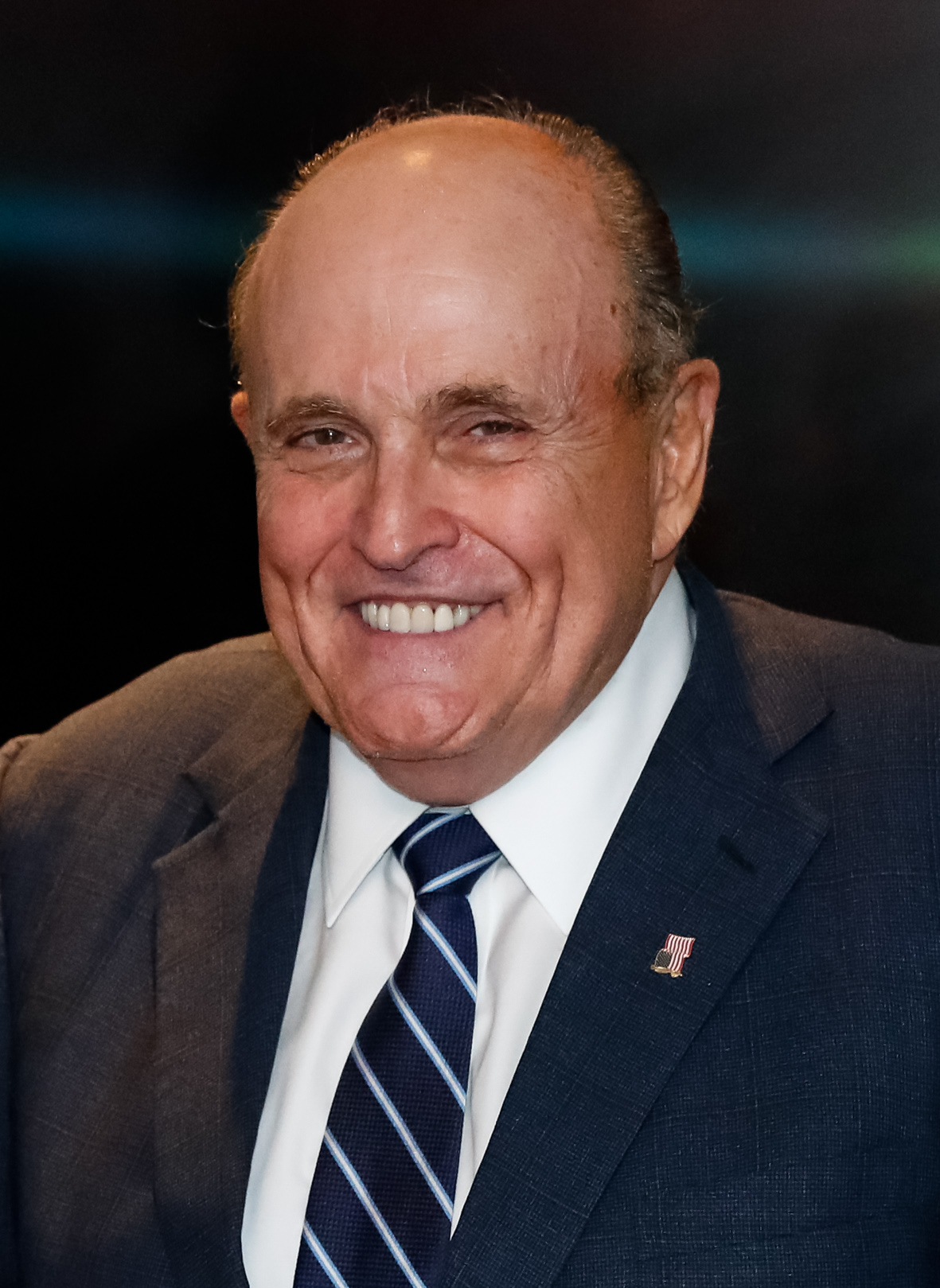
Rudy Giuliani, Worst Supporting Actor and Worst Screen Combo winner

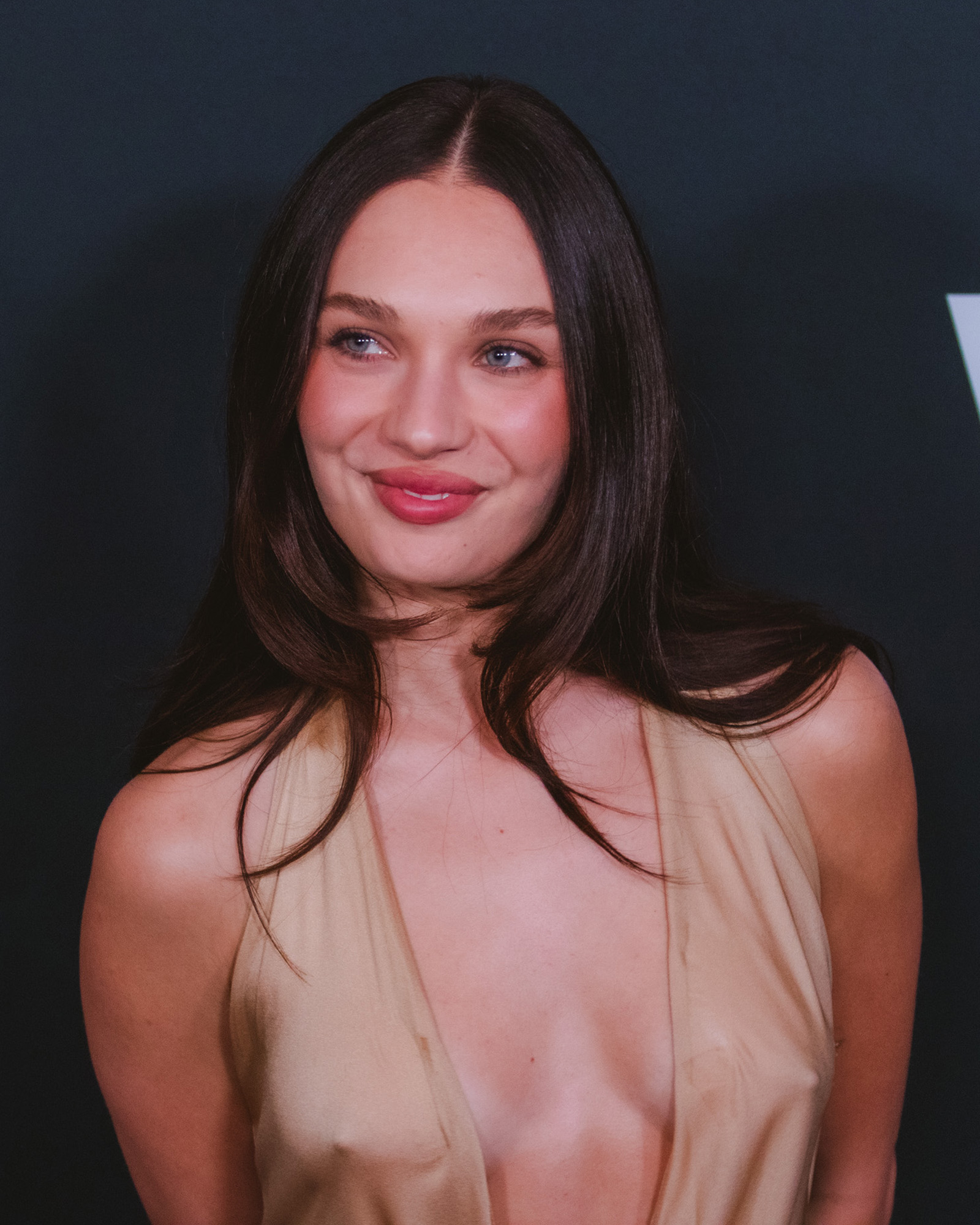
Maddie Ziegler, Worst Supporting Actress winner

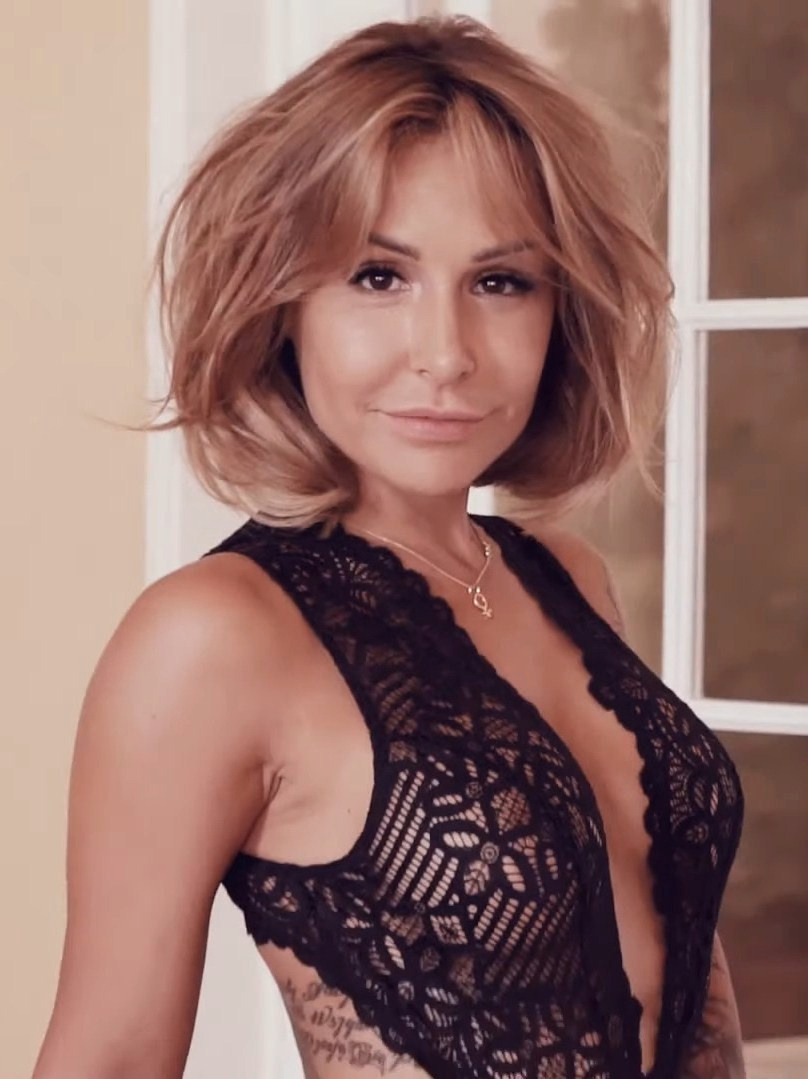
Blanka Lipińska, Worst Screenplay co-winner

The nominees were announced on March 12, 2021, while the winners were announced on April 24, 2021.

Worst Picture: Absolute Proof (One America News Network) – Mary Fanning, Brannon Howse, and Mike Lindell; 365 Days (Next Film) – Maciej Kawulski, Ewa Lewandowska, and Tomasz Mandes; Dolittle (Universal) – Susan Downey, Jeff Kirschenbaum, and Joe Roth; Fantasy Island (Columbia) – Jason Blum, Marc Toberoff, and Jeff Wadlow; Music (Vertical) – Sia and Vincent Landay	Worst Director: Sia – Music; Charles Band – All 3 Barbie & Kendra movies (Corona Zombies, Barbie & Kendra Save the Tiger King, and Barbie & Kendra Storm Area 51); Barbara Białowąs and Tomasz Mandes – 365 Days; Stephen Gaghan – Dolittle; Ron Howard – Hillbilly Elegy
Worst Actor: Mike Lindell (The "My Pillow" Guy) – Absolute Proof as Himself; Robert Downey Jr. – Dolittle as Dr. John Dolittle; Michele Morrone – 365 Days as Don Massimo Torricelli; Adam Sandler – Hubie Halloween as Hubie Dubois; David Spade – The Wrong Missy as Tim Morris	Worst Actress: Kate Hudson – Music as Kazu "Zu" Gamble; Anne Hathaway – The Last Thing He Wanted and Roald Dahl's The Witches as Elena McMahon and Grand High Witch (respectively); Katie Holmes – Brahms: The Boy II and The Secret: Dare to Dream as Liza and Miranda Wells (respectively); Lauren Lapkus – The Wrong Missy as Missy; Anna-Maria Sieklucka – 365 Days as Laura Biel
Worst Supporting Actor: Rudy Giuliani – Borat Subsequent Moviefilm as "Himself"; Chevy Chase – The Very Excellent Mr. Dundee as Chevy; Shia LaBeouf – The Tax Collector as Creeper; Arnold Schwarzenegger – Iron Mask as James Hook; Bruce Willis – Breach, Hard Kill, and Survive the Night as Clay Young, Donovan Chalmers, and Frank Clark (respectively)	Worst Supporting Actress: Maddie Ziegler – Music as Music Gamble; Glenn Close – Hillbilly Elegy as Bonnie "Mamaw" Vance (also Oscar-nominated for the same role); Lucy Hale – Fantasy Island as Melanie Cole; Maggie Q – Fantasy Island as Gwen Olsen; Kristen Wiig – Wonder Woman 1984 as Barbara Minerva / Cheetah
Worst Screen Combo: Rudy Giuliani and his pants zipper – Borat Subsequent Moviefilm; Robert Downey Jr. and his utterly unconvincing "Welsh" accent – Dolittle; Harrison Ford and that totally fake-looking CGI "dog" – The Call of the Wild; Lauren Lapkus and David Spade – The Wrong Missy; Adam Sandler and his grating simpleton voice – Hubie Halloween	Worst Remake, Rip-off or Sequel: Dolittle (Universal); 365 Days (Note: Polish Remake/Rip-off of Fifty Shades of Grey (2015)) (Next Film); Fantasy Island (Columbia); Hubie Halloween (Note: Remake/Rip-off of Ernest Scared Stupid (1991)) (Netflix); Wonder Woman 1984 (Warner Bros.)
Worst Screenplay: 365 Days – Tomasz Klimala, Barbara Białowąs, Tomasz Mandes, and Blanka Lipińska; based on the novel ("365 dni") by Lipińska; All 3 Barbie & Kendra movies (Corona Zombies, Barbie & Kendra Save the Tiger King, and Barbie & Kendra Storm Area 51) – Kent Roudebush, Silvia St. Croix, and Billy Butler; Dolittle – Stephen Gaghan, Dan Gregor, and Doug Mand; based on the character by Hugh Lofting; Fantasy Island – Jeff Wadlow, Chris Roach, and Jillian Jacobs; based on the television series of the same name created by Gene Levitt; Hillbilly Elegy – Vanessa Taylor; based on the memoir of the same name by JD Vance
Special Governors' Award: 2020 as "The Worst Calendar Year EVER!"

== Films with multiple nominations and wins ==
The following films received multiple nominations:

Films with multiple nominations
Nominations	Film
6	365 Days
6	Dolittle
5	Fantasy Island
4	Music
3	Hillbilly Elegy
3	Hubie Halloween
3	The Wrong Missy
2	Absolute Proof
2	Barbie & Kendra Save the Tiger King
2	Barbie & Kendra Storm Area 51
2	Borat Subsequent Moviefilm
2	Corona Zombies
2	Wonder Woman 1984

The following films received multiple wins:

Films with multiple wins
Wins	Film
3	Music
2	Absolute Proof
2	Borat Subsequent Moviefilm
