= Ewa Kasprzyk =

Ewa Kasprzyk may refer to:

- Ewa Kasprzyk (actress) (born 1957), Polish actress
- Ewa Kasprzyk (athlete) (born 1957), retired Polish athlete
