= Dark Room (Michele Morrone album) =

Studio album by Michele Morrone
- Released: February 14, 2020
- Recorded: 2020
- Genre: Pop rock
- Length: 30:50
- Language: English
- Label: Agora; Polydor Germany; Universal Music Group
- Producer: Dominic Buczkowski-Wojtaszek; Patryk Kumór

Singles from Dark Room
- 1. "Feel It" Released: 17 January 2020; 2. "Hard For Me" Released: 24 July 2020

Dark Room is the debut studio album by Italian singer Michele Morrone. It was released by Agora, Polydor Germany and Universal Music Group on 14 February 2020. It is partly a promotion for the film 365 Days.

== Critical reception ==
The album was given a bad review by Interia journalist Paweł Waliński. He called the album an "extremely tasteless, aggressive promotion" for 365 Days. He compared the studio album to "a dwarf that shows up during a pâté feast". He noted that Morrone did not know how to sing completely, and wrote about the musicians who participated in the recording of the songs that they played "in a decent craftsman's class".

In her review Agnieszka Szachowska, writing for the portal Kulturalne Media, mentioned the fact that four songs from the album were used in the film 365 Days. She explained that the lyrics and music of the songs were "sensual, but definitely commercial". She wrote that "the potential was only shown in the last 3 songs of the album". He also described the album as "not too ambitious rock/pop album".

== Track listing ==
Track listing and credits adapted from Tidal.

Dark Room track listing
No.	Title	Writer(s)	Producer(s)	Length
1.	"Drink Me"	Dominic Buczkowski-Wojtaszek; Patryk Kumór; Michele Morrone	Buczkowski-Wojtaszek; Kumór	2:13
2.	"Hard For Me"	Buczkowski-Wojtaszek; Kumór; Morrone	Buczkowski-Wojtaszek; Kumór	2:58
3.	"Watch Me Burn"	Małgorzata Uściłowska; Buczkowski-Wojtaszek; Kumór; Morrone	Buczkowski-Wojtaszek; Kumór	3:06
4.	"Dark Room"	Morrone	Buczkowski-Wojtaszek; Kumór	3:05
5.	"Feel It"	Buczkowski-Wojtaszek; Kumór; Morrone	Buczkowski-Wojtaszek; Kumór	2:39
6.	"Do It Like That"	Buczkowski-Wojtaszek; Kumór; Morrone	Buczkowski-Wojtaszek; Kumór	2:16
7.	"Rain in The Hearth"	Buczkowski-Wojtaszek; Kumór; Morrone	Buczkowski-Wojtaszek; Kumór	3:55
8.	"Dad"	Buczkowski-Wojtaszek; Kumór; Morrone	Buczkowski-Wojtaszek; Kumór	3:24
9.	"No One Cares"	Buczkowski-Wojtaszek; Kumór; Morrone	Buczkowski-Wojtaszek; Kumór	3:02
10.	"Next"	Morrone	Buczkowski-Wojtaszek; Kumór	4:12
Total length:				30:50

Dark Room – vinyl edition
No.	Title	Writer(s)	Producer(s)	Length
1.	"Feel It"	Buczkowski-Wojtaszek; Kumór; Morrone	Buczkowski-Wojtaszek; Kumór	2:39
2.	"Hard For Me"	Buczkowski-Wojtaszek; Kumór; Morrone	Buczkowski-Wojtaszek; Kumór	2:58
3.	"Watch Me Burn"	Uściłowska; Buczkowski-Wojtaszek; Kumór; Morrone	Buczkowski-Wojtaszek; Kumór	3:06
4.	"Dark Room"	Morrone	Buczkowski-Wojtaszek; Kumór	3:05
Total length:				11:48

Dark Room (Bonus Edition)
No.	Title	Writer(s)	Producer(s)	Length
11.	"Hard for Me (Acoustic)"	Buczkowski-Wojtaszek; Kumór; Morrone	Buczkowski-Wojtaszek; Kumór	2:36
12.	"Dad (Acoustic)"	Buczkowski-Wojtaszek; Kumór; Morrone	Buczkowski-Wojtaszek; Kumór	3:20
13.	"Hard for Me (R3HAB Remix)"	Buczkowski-Wojtaszek; Kumór; Morrone	Buczkowski-Wojtaszek; Kumór; Fadil El Ghoul^{[a]}	2:11
Total length:				38:57

Notes

- ^{^[a]} – production for the remixed version

== Charts ==
=== Weekly charts ===
Chart performance for Dark Room
Chart (2020)	Peak position
Belgian Albums (Ultratop Wallonia)	178
German Albums (Offizielle Top 100)	72
French Albums (SNEP)	195
Polish Albums (ZPAV)	2
Swiss Albums (Schweizer Hitparade)	63

=== Year-end charts ===
Year-end chart performance for Dark Room
Chart (2020)	Position
Polish Albums (ZPAV)	38

== Certifications ==
Certifications and sales for Dark Room
Region	Certification	Certified units/sales
Poland (ZPAV)	Platinum	20,000^{‡}
^{‡} Sales+streaming figures based on certification alone.

== Release history ==
Region	Date	Format	Version	Label	Ref.
Various	31 July 2020	CD, MP3	standard	Universal Music/Polydor Germany	
Various	14 February 2020	digital download, streaming	standard	Universal Music/Polydor Germany	
Various	25 July 2020	vinyl	vinyl edition	Agora/Universal Music Polska	
Poland	14 February 2020	CD, MP3	standard	Agora/Universal Music Polska	
