= Corona Zombies =

2020 film directed by Charles Band

- Promotional release poster
- Directed by: Charles Band
- Written by: Kent Roudebush; Silvia St. Croix
- Produced by: Charles Band
- Starring: Cody Renee Cameron; Russell Coker; Robin Sydney
- Production company: Full Moon Features
- Distributed by: Full Moon Features
- Release date: April 10, 2020
- Running time: 61 minutes
- Country: United States
- Language: English

Corona Zombies is a 2020 American comedy horror film directed by Charles Band, and produced and distributed by Full Moon Features. The film stars Cody Renee Cameron, Russell Coker and Robin Sydney. It is the first installment of the Barbie & Kendra film series.

Corona Zombies was released digitally through Full Moon Features' website and app on April 10, 2020. Later that year, it was followed by three sequels also directed by Band, Barbie & Kendra Save the Tiger King, Barbie & Kendra Storm Area 51 and Barbie & Kendra Crash Joe Bob's Drive-in Jamboree with Cameron and Sydney reprising their roles.

== Plot ==
Inspired by the COVID-19 pandemic, the film stars Cody Renee Cameron as Barbie, a woman who finds herself facing an outbreak of zombies infected by coronavirus disease 2019 (COVID-19).

== Cast ==
- Cody Renee Cameron as Barbie
- Russell Coker as Corona Zombie
- Robin Sydney as Kendra

== Production ==
Corona Zombies was filmed over a period of 28 days. The film consists primarily of redubbed and repurposed footage from Hell of the Living Dead and Zombies vs. Strippers, as well as clips of real-world news footage.

== Release ==
The film premiered digitally through Full Moon Features' website and app on April 10, 2020.

== Reception ==
Stuart Heritage of The Guardian called the film "the sort of thing you'd watch drunk in your house at midnight. But then again, that's how you're going to watch all films for the foreseeable future, so it has to be worth a go." The National's Katy Gillett, in her review of the film, wrote: "If zombie movies are your thing, and you can acknowledge them as pure escapism that isn't to be taken seriously, then you're probably fine. If not, I'd skip it." Alan Ng of Film Threat called Corona Zombies "a hilarious satire of this whole pandemic", comparing it favorably to the 1966 film What's Up, Tiger Lily? and the television series Mystery Science Theater 3000.

=== Accolades ===
Year	Awards	Category	Recipient(s)	Result	Ref(s)
2021	Golden Raspberry Awards	Worst Director	Charles Band (also for Barbie & Kendra Save the Tiger King and Barbie & Kendra Storm Area 51)	Nominated	
2021	Golden Raspberry Awards	Worst Screenplay	Kent Roudebush, Silvia St. Croix and Billy Butler (also for Barbie & Kendra Save the Tiger King and Barbie & Kendra Storm Area 51)	Nominated	

== Sequels ==
Corona Zombies was followed by three sequels, Barbie & Kendra Save the Tiger King, Barbie & Kendra Storm Area 51 and Barbie & Kendra Crash Joe Bob's Drive-in Jamboree. Both sequels were directed by Band, star Cody Renee Cameron as Barbie and Robin Sydney as Kendra, and were released in 2020. Barbie & Kendra Crash Joe Bob's Drive-in Jamboree released in 2024.

Barbie and Kendra are also featured in the last movie of the Evil Bong franchise, the Evil Bong 888: Infinity High.

== See also ==
- Impact of the COVID-19 pandemic on cinema
- Corona (film)
- Coronavirus (india film)
- Songbird
