= The Taming of the Shrewd =

- Polish: Poskromienie złośnicy
- Directed by: Anna Wieczur-Bluszcz
- Starring: Piotr Cyrwus; Jan Kardasinski; Magdalena Lamparska
- Production companies: Bagatela Studio; Orient-Film
- Distributed by: Netflix
- Release date: 13 April 2022
- Running time: 112 minutes
- Country: Poland
- Languages: Polish; English

The Taming of the Shrewd (Polish: Poskromienie złośnicy) is a 2022 Polish film directed by Anna Wieczur-Bluszcz and starring Piotr Cyrwus, Jan Kardasinski and Magdalena Lamparska.

A sequel was released on 2023.

== Premise ==
After having her heart broken, a scientist moves back home to Podhale to start anew.

== Cast ==
- Magdalena Lamparska
- Mikolaj Roznerski
- Piotr Cyrwus
- Tomasz Sapryk
- Jan Kardasinski
- Dorota Landowska
- Adam Malysz
- Piotr Polk
- Magdalena Schejbal
- Dorota Stalinska
- Elzbieta Trzaskos
- Mariusz Wach
- Slawomir Zapala
