= Magdalena Lamparska =

Polish film and theater actress (born 1988)

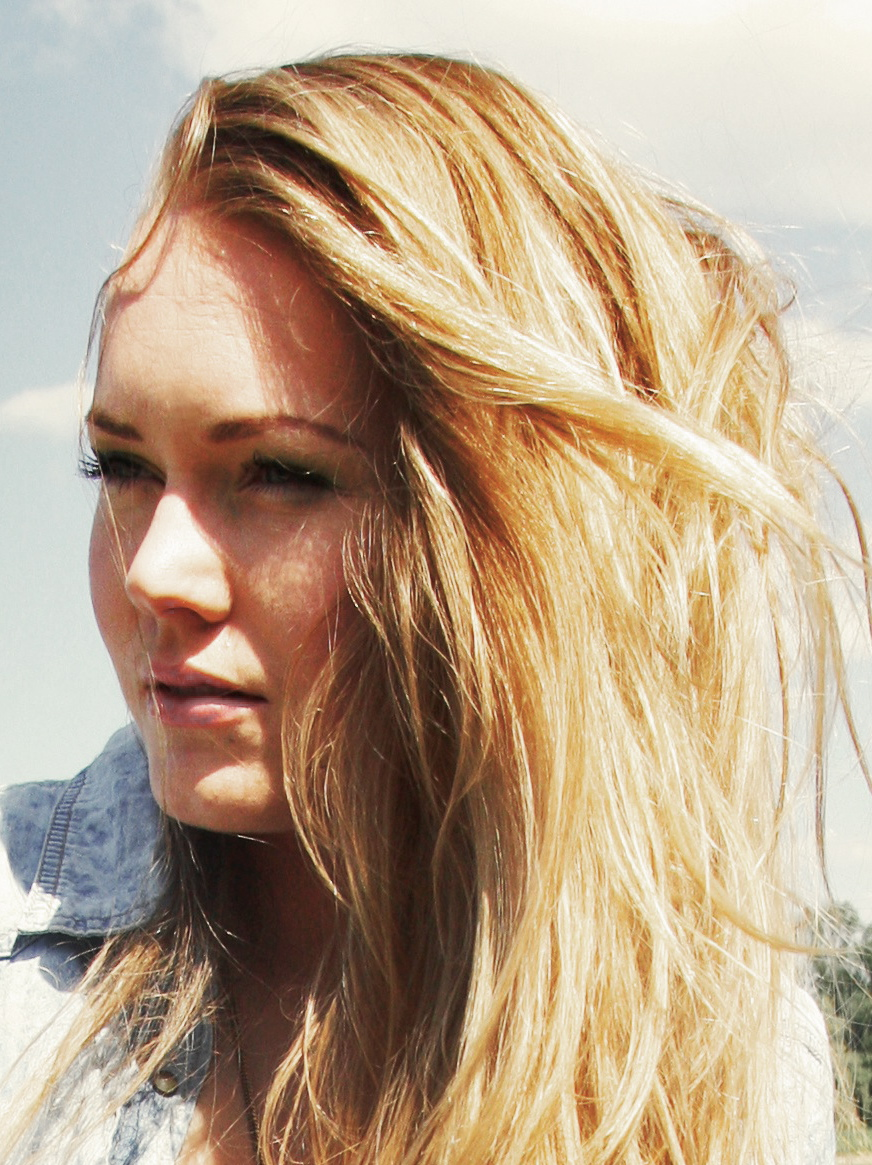
- Magdalena Lamparska
- Born: January 6, 1988 (age 38); Słupsk, Poland
- Occupation: Actress
- Years active: 2007–present
- Website: magdalenalamparska.com

Magdalena Lamparska (born 6 January 1988, Słupsk, Poland) is a Polish film and theater actress. In 2011, Lamparska graduated from the Aleksander Zelwerowicz State Theatre Academy in Warsaw.

Lamparska gained popularity in Poland with her role of Marta in the TV series 39 and a Half (Polish: 39 i pół) (2008–2009). In 2020, she starred in the highly successful Netflix film 365 Days. In 2021, she was reported to be returning for two announced sequels to the film.

== Filmography ==
- Jutro idziemy do kina, 2007
- Tylko nie teraz/Tolko ne seychas, 2008
- 39 i pół, 2008–2009
- Zero, 2009
- Możesz być kim chcesz?, 2009
- Na dobre i na złe (episode 432), 2010
- Hotel 52, 2010–2011
- Ojciec Mateusz (episode 76), 2011
- Sałatka z bakłażana, 2011
- Big Love, 2012
- True Law (episode 28), 2012
- To nie koniec świata, 2013
- Bogowie, 2014
- No Panic, With a Hint of Hysteria, 2016
- The Zookeeper's Wife, 2017
- 365 Days, 2020
- Banksterzy, 2020
- The End, 2021
- How I Fell in Love with a Gangster, 2022
- The Taming of the Shrewd, 2022
- 365 Days: This Day, 2022
- The Next 365 Days, 2022
- The Taming of the Shrewd 2, 2023
