= Golden Raspberry Award for Worst Actress =

Annual accolade

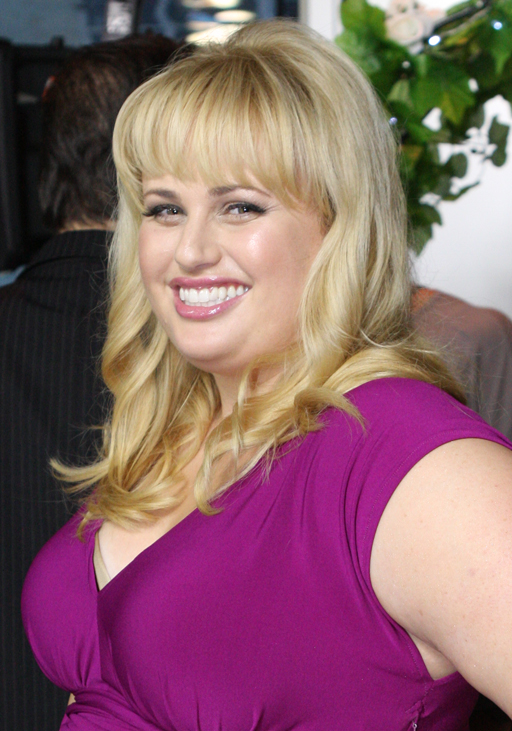
- The 2025 Winner: Rebel Wilson
- Awarded for: Worst in film
- Country: United States
- Presented by: Golden Raspberry Award Foundation
- First award: Brooke Shields, The Blue Lagoon (1980)
- Currently held by: Rebel Wilson, Bride Hard (2025)
- Website: razzies.com

Razzie Award for Worst Actress is an award presented at the annual Golden Raspberry Awards to the worst actress of the previous year. Male actors performing in drag are eligible, as it is intended as a humorous award.

The following is a list of recipients and nominees of that award, along with the films for which they were nominated.

The category of "actress" has expanded to include the subjects of documentary films.

To date, two nominations have been rescinded. On March 31, 2022, the Golden Raspberry committee decided to rescind Shelley Duvall's nomination for her performance in The Shining, stating that it was recently brought to their attention that the performance was affected by the intense treatment she received from director Stanley Kubrick and that they didn't wish to punish victims. On January 24, 2023, a day after announcing the nominees for the 43rd Golden Raspberry Awards, the Razzies decided to rescind their nomination for Ryan Kiera Armstrong after facing immense backlash for what was publicly perceived as cruel, given the fact that Armstrong was a minor at the time of the nomination.

== Winners and nominees ==
=== 1980s ===
Year	Actress	Film	Character
1980 (1st)	Brooke Shields	The Blue Lagoon	Emmeline Lestrange
1980 (1st)	Nancy Allen	Dressed to Kill	Liz Blake
1980 (1st)	Faye Dunaway	The First Deadly Sin	Barbara Delaney
1980 (1st)	~~Shelley Duvall~~ (Note: Duvall's nomination was rescinded in 2022 in acknowledgement that her performance was impacted by director Stanley Kubrick's intense treatment of her.)	~~The Shining~~	~~Wendy Torrance~~
1980 (1st)	Farrah Fawcett	Saturn 3	Alex
1980 (1st)	Sondra Locke	Bronco Billy	Antoinette Lily
1980 (1st)	Olivia Newton-John	Xanadu	Kira
1980 (1st)	Valerie Perrine	Can't Stop the Music	Samantha Simpson
1980 (1st)	Deborah Raffin	Touched by Love	Lena Canada
1980 (1st)	Talia Shire	Windows	Emily Hollander
1981 (2nd)	Bo Derek (tie)	Tarzan, the Ape Man	Jane Parker
1981 (2nd)	Faye Dunaway (tie)	Mommie Dearest	Joan Crawford
1981 (2nd)	Linda Blair	Hell Night	Marti Gaines
1981 (2nd)	Brooke Shields	Endless Love	Jade Butterfield
1981 (2nd)	Barbra Streisand	All Night Long	Cheryl Gibbons
1982 (3rd)	Pia Zadora	Butterfly	Kady Tyler
1982 (3rd)	Morgan Fairchild	The Seduction	Jamie Douglas
1982 (3rd)	Mia Farrow	A Midsummer Night's Sex Comedy	Ariel
1982 (3rd)	Kristy McNichol	The Pirate Movie	Mabel Stanley
1982 (3rd)	Mary Tyler Moore	Six Weeks	Charlotte Dreyfus
1983 (4th)	Pia Zadora	The Lonely Lady	Jerilee Randall
1983 (4th)	Loni Anderson	Stroker Ace	Pembrook Feeny
1983 (4th)	Linda Blair	Chained Heat	Carol Henderson
1983 (4th)	Faye Dunaway	The Wicked Lady	Barbara Skelton
1983 (4th)	Olivia Newton-John	Two of a Kind	Debbie Wylder
1984 (5th)	Bo Derek	Bolero	Ayre "Mac" MacGillvary
1984 (5th)	Faye Dunaway	Supergirl	Selena
1984 (5th)	Shirley MacLaine	Cannonball Run II	Veronica
1984 (5th)	Tanya Roberts	Sheena	Sheena
1984 (5th)	Brooke Shields	Sahara	Dale
1985 (6th)	Linda Blair	Night Patrol	Sue Perman
1985 (6th)	Linda Blair	Savage Island	Daly
1985 (6th)	Linda Blair	Savage Streets	Brenda
1985 (6th)	Ariane	Year of the Dragon	Tracy Tzu
1985 (6th)	Jennifer Beals	The Bride	Eva
1985 (6th)	Brigitte Nielsen	Red Sonja	Red Sonja
1985 (6th)	Tanya Roberts	A View to a Kill	Stacey Sutton
1986 (7th)	Madonna	Shanghai Surprise	Gloria Tatlock
1986 (7th)	Kim Basinger	9½ Weeks	Elizabeth McGraw
1986 (7th)	Joan Chen	Tai-Pan	May–May
1986 (7th)	Brigitte Nielsen	Cobra	Ingrid Knudsen
1986 (7th)	Ally Sheedy	Blue City	Annie Rayford
1987 (8th)	Madonna	Who's That Girl	Nikki Finn
1987 (8th)	Lorraine Gary	Jaws: The Revenge	Ellen Brody
1987 (8th)	Sondra Locke	Ratboy	Nikki Morrison
1987 (8th)	Debra Sandlund	Tough Guys Don't Dance	Patty Lareine
1987 (8th)	Sharon Stone	Allan Quatermain and the Lost City of Gold	Jesse Huston
1988 (9th)	Liza Minnelli	Arthur 2: On the Rocks	Linda Marolla Bach
1988 (9th)	Liza Minnelli	Rent-a-Cop	Della Roberts
1988 (9th)	Rebecca De Mornay	And God Created Woman	Robin Shea
1988 (9th)	Whoopi Goldberg	The Telephone	Vashti Blue
1988 (9th)	Cassandra Peterson	Elvira: Mistress of the Dark	Elvira
1988 (9th)	Vanity	Action Jackson	Sydney Ash
1989 (10th)	Heather Locklear	The Return of Swamp Thing	Abby Arcane
1989 (10th)	Jane Fonda	Old Gringo	Harriet Winslow
1989 (10th)	Brigitte Nielsen	Bye Bye Baby	Lisa
1989 (10th)	Paulina Porizkova	Her Alibi	Nina
1989 (10th)	Ally Sheedy	Heart of Dixie	Maggie DeLoach

=== 1990s ===
Year	Actress	Film	Character
1990 (11th)	Bo Derek	Ghosts Can't Do It	Katie O'Dare
1990 (11th)	Melanie Griffith	The Bonfire of the Vanities	Maria Ruskin
1990 (11th)	Bette Midler	Stella	Stella Claire
1990 (11th)	Molly Ringwald	Betsy's Wedding	Betsy Hopper
1990 (11th)	Talia Shire	Rocky V	Adrian Balboa
1991 (12th)	Sean Young	A Kiss Before Dying	Ellen Carlsson
1991 (12th)	Kim Basinger	The Marrying Man	Vicki Anderson
1991 (12th)	Sally Field	Not Without My Daughter	Betty Mahmoody
1991 (12th)	Madonna (Note: Nomination is for a documentary appearance, not an acting performance.)	Madonna: Truth or Dare	Herself
1991 (12th)	Demi Moore	The Butcher's Wife	Marina Lemke
1991 (12th)	Demi Moore	Nothing but Trouble	Diane Lightson
1992 (13th)	Melanie Griffith	Shining Through	Linda Voss
1992 (13th)	Melanie Griffith	A Stranger Among Us	Emily Eden
1992 (13th)	Kim Basinger	Cool World	Holli Would
1992 (13th)	Kim Basinger	Final Analysis	Heather Evans
1992 (13th)	Lorraine Bracco	Medicine Man	Dr. Rae Crane
1992 (13th)	Lorraine Bracco	Traces of Red	Ellen Schofield
1992 (13th)	Whitney Houston	The Bodyguard	Rachel Marron
1992 (13th)	Sean Young	Love Crimes	Dana Greenway
1993 (14th)	Madonna	Body of Evidence	Rebecca Carlson
1993 (14th)	Melanie Griffith	Born Yesterday	Billie Dawn
1993 (14th)	Janet Jackson	Poetic Justice	Justice
1993 (14th)	Demi Moore	Indecent Proposal	Diana Murphy
1993 (14th)	Sharon Stone	Sliver	Carly Norris
1994 (15th)	Sharon Stone	Intersection	Sally Eastman
1994 (15th)	Sharon Stone	The Specialist	May Munro
1994 (15th)	Kim Basinger	The Getaway	Carol McCoy
1994 (15th)	Joan Chen	On Deadly Ground	Masu
1994 (15th)	Jane March	Color of Night	Rose Dexter/Bonnie
1994 (15th)	Uma Thurman	Even Cowgirls Get the Blues	Sissy Hankshaw
1995 (16th)	Elizabeth Berkley	Showgirls	Nomi Malone
1995 (16th)	Cindy Crawford	Fair Game	Kate McQuean
1995 (16th)	Demi Moore	The Scarlet Letter	Hester Prynne
1995 (16th)	Julia Sweeney	It's Pat	Pat Riley
1995 (16th)	Sean Young	Dr. Jekyll and Ms. Hyde	Helen Hyde
1996 (17th)	Demi Moore	The Juror	Annie Laird
1996 (17th)	Demi Moore	Striptease	Erin Grant
1996 (17th)	Pamela Anderson	Barb Wire	Barbara "Barb Wire" Kopetski
1996 (17th)	Whoopi Goldberg	Bogus	Harriet Franklin
1996 (17th)	Whoopi Goldberg	Eddie	Edwina 'Eddie' Franklin
1996 (17th)	Whoopi Goldberg	Theodore Rex	Katie Coltrane
1996 (17th)	Melanie Griffith	Two Much	Betty Kerner
1996 (17th)	Julia Roberts	Mary Reilly	Mary Reilly
1997 (18th)	Demi Moore	G.I. Jane	Lt. Jordan O'Neil
1997 (18th)	Sandra Bullock	Speed 2: Cruise Control	Annie Porter
1997 (18th)	Fran Drescher	The Beautician and the Beast	Joy Miller
1997 (18th)	Lauren Holly	A Smile Like Yours	Jennifer Robertson
1997 (18th)	Lauren Holly	Turbulence	Teri Halloran
1997 (18th)	Alicia Silverstone	Excess Baggage	Emily Hope
1998 (19th)	Spice Girls (Note: Consisting of Victoria Beckham, Emma Bunton, Geri Halliwell, Melanie B and Melanie C)	Spice World	Themselves
1998 (19th)	Yasmine Bleeth	BASEketball	Jenna Reed
1998 (19th)	Anne Heche	Psycho	Marion Crane
1998 (19th)	Jessica Lange	Hush	Martha Baring
1998 (19th)	Uma Thurman	The Avengers	Emma Peel
1999 (20th)	Heather Donahue	The Blair Witch Project	Heather Donahue
1999 (20th)	Melanie Griffith	Crazy in Alabama	Lucille Vinson
1999 (20th)	Milla Jovovich	The Messenger: The Story of Joan of Arc	Joan of Arc
1999 (20th)	Sharon Stone	Gloria	Gloria
1999 (20th)	Catherine Zeta-Jones	Entrapment	Virginia Baker
1999 (20th)	Catherine Zeta-Jones	The Haunting	Theo

=== 2000s ===
Year	Actress	Film	Character
2000 (21st)	Madonna	The Next Best Thing	Abbie Reynolds
2000 (21st)	Kim Basinger	Bless the Child	Maggie O'Connor
2000 (21st)	Kim Basinger	I Dreamed of Africa	Kuki Gallmann
2000 (21st)	Melanie Griffith	Cecil B. Demented	Honey Whitlock
2000 (21st)	Bette Midler	Isn't She Great	Jacqueline Susann
2000 (21st)	Demi Moore	Passion of Mind	Martha Marie / 'Marty' Talridge
2001 (22nd)	Mariah Carey	Glitter	Billie Frank
2001 (22nd)	Penélope Cruz	Blow	Mirtha Jung
2001 (22nd)	Penélope Cruz	Captain Corelli's Mandolin	Pelagia
2001 (22nd)	Penélope Cruz	Vanilla Sky	Sofia Serrano
2001 (22nd)	Angelina Jolie	Lara Croft: Tomb Raider	Lara Croft
2001 (22nd)	Angelina Jolie	Original Sin	Julia Russell / Bonny Castle
2001 (22nd)	Jennifer Lopez	Angel Eyes	Sharon Pogue
2001 (22nd)	Jennifer Lopez	The Wedding Planner	Mary Fiore
2001 (22nd)	Charlize Theron	Sweet November	Sara Deever
2002 (23rd)	Madonna (tie)	Swept Away	Amber Leighton
2002 (23rd)	Britney Spears (tie)	Crossroads	Lucy Wagner
2002 (23rd)	Angelina Jolie	Life or Something Like It	Lanie Kerrigan
2002 (23rd)	Jennifer Lopez	Enough	Slim Hiller
2002 (23rd)	Jennifer Lopez	Maid in Manhattan	Marisa Ventura
2002 (23rd)	Winona Ryder	Mr. Deeds	Babe Bennett
2003 (24th)	Jennifer Lopez	Gigli	Ricki
2003 (24th)	Drew Barrymore	Charlie's Angels: Full Throttle	Dylan Sanders
2003 (24th)	Drew Barrymore	Duplex	Nancy Kendricks
2003 (24th)	Kelly Clarkson	From Justin to Kelly	Kelly Taylor
2003 (24th)	Cameron Diaz	Charlie's Angels: Full Throttle	Natalie Cook
2003 (24th)	Angelina Jolie	Beyond Borders	Sarah Jordan
2003 (24th)	Angelina Jolie	Lara Croft: Tomb Raider – The Cradle of Life	Lara Croft
2004 (25th)	Halle Berry	Catwoman	Patience Phillips / Catwoman
2004 (25th)	Hilary Duff	A Cinderella Story	Sam Montgomery
2004 (25th)	Hilary Duff	Raise Your Voice	Terri Fletcher
2004 (25th)	Angelina Jolie	Alexander	Queen Olympias
2004 (25th)	Angelina Jolie	Taking Lives	Illeana Scott
2004 (25th)	Mary-Kate and Ashley Olsen	New York Minute	Roxy and Jane Ryan
2004 (25th)	Shawn and Marlon Wayans (the Wayans "sisters") (Note: Male actor(s) performing in drag.)	White Chicks	"Brittany and Tiffany Wilson"
2005 (26th)	Jenny McCarthy	Dirty Love	Rebecca Sommers
2005 (26th)	Jessica Alba	Fantastic Four	Sue Storm / Invisible Woman
2005 (26th)	Jessica Alba	Into the Blue	Sam
2005 (26th)	Hilary Duff	Cheaper by the Dozen 2	Lorraine Baker
2005 (26th)	Hilary Duff	The Perfect Man	Holly Hamilton
2005 (26th)	Jennifer Lopez	Monster-in-Law	Charlie Cantilini
2005 (26th)	Tara Reid	Alone in the Dark	Aline Cedrac
2006 (27th)	Sharon Stone	Basic Instinct 2	Catherine Tramell
2006 (27th)	Hilary and Haylie Duff	Material Girls	Tanzie and Ava Marchetta
2006 (27th)	Lindsay Lohan	Just My Luck	Ashley Albright
2006 (27th)	Kristanna Loken	BloodRayne	Rayne
2006 (27th)	Jessica Simpson	Employee of the Month	Amy Renfro
2007 (28th)	Lindsay Lohan	I Know Who Killed Me	Dakota Moss and Aubrey Fleming
2007 (28th)	Jessica Alba	Awake	Sam Lockwood
2007 (28th)	Jessica Alba	Fantastic Four: Rise of the Silver Surfer	Sue Storm / Invisible Woman
2007 (28th)	Jessica Alba	Good Luck Chuck	Cam Wexler
2007 (28th)	Logan Browning, Janel Parrish, Nathalia Ramos and Skyler Shaye	Bratz	Sasha, Jade, Yasmin and Cloe
2007 (28th)	Elisha Cuthbert	Captivity	Jennifer Tree
2007 (28th)	Diane Keaton	Because I Said So	Daphne Wilder
2008 (29th)	Paris Hilton	The Hottie and the Nottie	Cristabel Abbott
2008 (29th)	Jessica Alba	The Eye	Sydney Wells
2008 (29th)	Jessica Alba	The Love Guru	Jane Bullard
2008 (29th)	Annette Bening, Eva Mendes, Debra Messing, Jada Pinkett Smith and Meg Ryan	The Women	Sylvie Fowler, Crystal Allen, Edie Cohen, Alex Fisher and Mary Haines
2008 (29th)	Cameron Diaz	What Happens in Vegas	Joy McNally
2008 (29th)	Kate Hudson	Fool's Gold	Tess Finnegan
2008 (29th)	Kate Hudson	My Best Friend's Girl	Alexis
2009 (30th)	Sandra Bullock	All About Steve	Mary Horowitz
2009 (30th)	Beyoncé	Obsessed	Sharon Charles
2009 (30th)	Miley Cyrus	Hannah Montana: The Movie	Miley Stewart / Hannah Montana
2009 (30th)	Megan Fox	Jennifer's Body	Jennifer Check
2009 (30th)	Megan Fox	Transformers: Revenge of the Fallen	Mikaela Banes
2009 (30th)	Sarah Jessica Parker	Did You Hear About the Morgans?	Meryl Morgan

=== 2010s ===
Year	Actress	Film	Character
2010 (31st)	Kim Cattrall, Kristin Davis, Cynthia Nixon and Sarah Jessica Parker	Sex and the City 2	Samantha Jones, Charlotte York Goldenblatt, Miranda Hobbes and Carrie Bradshaw
2010 (31st)	Jennifer Aniston	The Bounty Hunter	Nicole Hurley
2010 (31st)	Jennifer Aniston	The Switch	Kassie Larson
2010 (31st)	Miley Cyrus	The Last Song	Ronnie Miller
2010 (31st)	Megan Fox	Jonah Hex	Tallulah Black / Lilah
2010 (31st)	Kristen Stewart	The Twilight Saga: Eclipse	Bella Swan
2011 (32nd)	Adam Sandler	Jack and Jill	Jill Sadelstein
2011 (32nd)	Martin Lawrence	Big Mommas: Like Father, Like Son	Big Momma
2011 (32nd)	Sarah Palin	The Undefeated	Herself
2011 (32nd)	Sarah Jessica Parker	I Don't Know How She Does It	Kate Reddy
2011 (32nd)	Sarah Jessica Parker	New Year's Eve	Kim Doyle
2011 (32nd)	Kristen Stewart	The Twilight Saga: Breaking Dawn – Part 1	Bella Swan
2012 (33rd)	Kristen Stewart	Snow White and the Huntsman	Snow White
2012 (33rd)	Kristen Stewart	The Twilight Saga: Breaking Dawn – Part 2	Bella Swan
2012 (33rd)	Katherine Heigl	One for the Money	Stephanie Plum
2012 (33rd)	Milla Jovovich	Resident Evil: Retribution	Alice
2012 (33rd)	Tyler Perry	Madea's Witness Protection	Mabel "Madea" Simmons
2012 (33rd)	Barbra Streisand	The Guilt Trip	Joyce Brewster
2013 (34th)	Tyler Perry	A Madea Christmas	Mabel "Madea" Simmons
2013 (34th)	Halle Berry	The Call	Jordan Turner
2013 (34th)	Halle Berry	Movie 43	Emily Browning
2013 (34th)	Selena Gomez	Getaway	The Kid
2013 (34th)	Lindsay Lohan	The Canyons	Tara Lloyd
2013 (34th)	Naomi Watts	Diana	Princess Diana
2013 (34th)	Naomi Watts	Movie 43	Samantha Miller
2014 (35th)	Cameron Diaz	The Other Woman	Carly Whitten
2014 (35th)	Cameron Diaz	Sex Tape	Annie Hargrove
2014 (35th)	Drew Barrymore	Blended	Lauren Reynolds
2014 (35th)	Melissa McCarthy	Tammy	Tammy Banks
2014 (35th)	Charlize Theron	A Million Ways to Die in the West	Anna Barnes-Leatherwood
2014 (35th)	Gaia Weiss	The Legend of Hercules	Hebe
2015 (36th)	Dakota Johnson	Fifty Shades of Grey	Anastasia "Ana" Steele
2015 (36th)	Katherine Heigl	Home Sweet Hell	Mona Champagne
2015 (36th)	Mila Kunis	Jupiter Ascending	Jupiter Jones
2015 (36th)	Jennifer Lopez	The Boy Next Door	Claire Peterson
2015 (36th)	Gwyneth Paltrow	Mortdecai	Johanna Mortdecai
2016 (37th)	Rebekah Turner (Note: The video revealing the winners listed the nominee as "The 'Actress' Who Played Hillary Clinton". Mikaela Krantz also played a younger Hillary Clinton in the film, but only Rebekah Turner was on the official list of nominees.)	Hillary's America: The Secret History of the Democratic Party	Hillary Clinton
2016 (37th)	Megan Fox	Teenage Mutant Ninja Turtles: Out of the Shadows	April O'Neil
2016 (37th)	Tyler Perry	Boo! A Madea Halloween	Mabel "Madea" Simmons
2016 (37th)	Julia Roberts	Mother's Day	Miranda Collins
2016 (37th)	Naomi Watts	Shut In	Mary Portman
2016 (37th)	Naomi Watts	The Divergent Series: Allegiant	Evelyn Johnson-Eaton
2016 (37th)	Shailene Woodley	The Divergent Series: Allegiant	Beatrice "Tris" Prior
2017 (38th)	Tyler Perry	Boo 2! A Madea Halloween	Mabel "Madea" Simmons
2017 (38th)	Katherine Heigl	Unforgettable	Tessa Connover
2017 (38th)	Dakota Johnson	Fifty Shades Darker	Anastasia "Ana" Steele
2017 (38th)	Jennifer Lawrence	mother!	mother
2017 (38th)	Emma Watson	The Circle	Mae Holland
2018 (39th)	Melissa McCarthy	The Happytime Murders	Connie Edwards
2018 (39th)	Melissa McCarthy	Life of the Party	Deanna Miles
2018 (39th)	Jennifer Garner	Peppermint	Riley North
2018 (39th)	Amber Heard	London Fields	Nicola Six
2018 (39th)	Helen Mirren	Winchester	Sarah Winchester
2018 (39th)	Amanda Seyfried	The Clapper	Judy
2019 (40th)	Hilary Duff	The Haunting of Sharon Tate	Sharon Tate
2019 (40th)	Anne Hathaway	The Hustle	Josephine Chesterfield
2019 (40th)	Anne Hathaway	Serenity	Karen Zariakas
2019 (40th)	Francesca Hayward	Cats	Victoria
2019 (40th)	Tyler Perry	A Madea Family Funeral	Mabel "Madea" Simmons
2019 (40th)	Rebel Wilson	The Hustle	Penny Rust

=== 2020s ===
Year	Actress	Film	Character
2020 (41st)
2020 (41st)	Kate Hudson	Music	Kazu "Zu" Gamble
2020 (41st)	Anne Hathaway	The Last Thing He Wanted	Elena McMahon
2020 (41st)	Anne Hathaway	The Witches	Grand High Witch
2020 (41st)	Katie Holmes	Brahms: The Boy II	Liza
2020 (41st)	Katie Holmes	The Secret: Dare to Dream	Miranda Wells
2020 (41st)	Lauren Lapkus	The Wrong Missy	Missy
2020 (41st)	Anna-Maria Sieklucka	365 Days	Laura Biel
2021 (42nd)
2021 (42nd)	Jeanna de Waal	Diana: The Musical	Princess Diana
2021 (42nd)	Amy Adams	The Woman in the Window	Dr. Anna Fox
2021 (42nd)	Megan Fox	Midnight in the Switchgrass	Rebecca Lombardi
2021 (42nd)	Taryn Manning	Karen	Karen Drexler
2021 (42nd)	Ruby Rose	Vanquish	Victoria
2022 (43rd)
2022 (43rd)	Golden Raspberry Awards (Note: Awarded for nominating Ryan Kiera Armstrong in the Worst Actress category)	—N/a	—N/a
2022 (43rd)	~~Ryan Kiera Armstrong~~ (Note: After receiving public backlash for nominating a minor, the Razzie committee decided to rescind their nomination for Ryan Kiera Armstrong on the grounds of it being tasteless)	~~Firestarter~~	~~Charlene "Charlie" McGee~~
2022 (43rd)	Bryce Dallas Howard	Jurassic World Dominion	Claire Dearing
2022 (43rd)	Diane Keaton	Mack & Rita	Mackenzie "Mack" Martin / Rita
2022 (43rd)	Kaya Scodelario	The King's Daughter	Marie-Josèphe
2022 (43rd)	Alicia Silverstone	The Requin	Jaelyn
2023 (44th)
2023 (44th)	Megan Fox	Johnny & Clyde	Alana Hart
2023 (44th)	Ana de Armas	Ghosted	Sadie Rhodes
2023 (44th)	Salma Hayek	Magic Mike's Last Dance	Maxandra Mendoza
2023 (44th)	Jennifer Lopez	The Mother	The Mother
2023 (44th)	Helen Mirren	Shazam! Fury of the Gods	Hespera
2024 (45th)
2024 (45th)	Dakota Johnson	Madame Web	Cassandra "Cassie" Webb / Madame Web
2024 (45th)	Cate Blanchett	Borderlands	Lillith
2024 (45th)	Bryce Dallas Howard	Argylle	Elly Conway
2024 (45th)	Lady Gaga	Joker: Folie à Deux	Harleen "Lee" Quinzel
2024 (45th)	Jennifer Lopez	Atlas	Atlas Shepherd
2025 (46th)
2025 (46th)	Rebel Wilson	Bride Hard	Sam
2025 (46th)	Ariana DeBose	Love Hurts	Rose Carlisle
2025 (46th)	Milla Jovovich	In the Lost Lands	Gray Alys
2025 (46th)	Natalie Portman	Fountain of Youth	Charlotte Purdue
2025 (46th)	Michelle Yeoh	Star Trek: Section 31	Philippa Georgiou

== Multiple wins and nominations ==
=== Multiple wins ===
5 wins

- Madonna

3 wins

- Bo Derek

2 wins

- Dakota Johnson
- Demi Moore
- Tyler Perry
- Sharon Stone
- Pia Zadora

=== Multiple nominations ===
7 nominations

- Jennifer Lopez

6 nominations

- Melanie Griffith
- Madonna
- Demi Moore

5 nominations

- Kim Basinger
- Megan Fox
- Tyler Perry
- Sharon Stone

4 nominations

- Hilary Duff
- Faye Dunaway
- Angelina Jolie

3 nominations

- Jessica Alba
- Linda Blair
- Bo Derek
- Cameron Diaz
- Katherine Heigl
- Dakota Johnson
- Milla Jovovich
- Lindsay Lohan
- Brigitte Nielsen
- Sarah Jessica Parker
- Brooke Shields
- Kristen Stewart
- Sean Young

2 nominations

- Drew Barrymore
- Halle Berry
- Sandra Bullock
- Joan Chen
- Miley Cyrus
- Whoopi Goldberg
- Anne Hathaway
- Bryce Dallas Howard
- Kate Hudson
- Diane Keaton
- Sondra Locke
- Melissa McCarthy
- Bette Midler
- Helen Mirren
- Olivia Newton-John
- Julia Roberts
- Tanya Roberts
- Ally Sheedy
- Talia Shire
- Alicia Silverstone
- Barbra Streisand
- Charlize Theron
- Uma Thurman
- Naomi Watts
- Rebel Wilson
- Pia Zadora
