= Michele Morrone =

Italian actor, model, and singer (born 1990)

- Morrone in 2019
- Born: 3 October 1990 (age 36); Bitonto, Apulia, Italy
- Occupations: Actor; model; singer
- Years active: 2011–present
- Spouse: Rouba Saadeh (m. 2014; div. 2018)
- Children: 2

Michele Morrone (Italian pronunciation: [miˈkɛːle morˈroːne]; born 3 October 1990) is an Italian actor, model and singer. He gained international recognition after portraying Massimo Torricelli in the 2020 erotic thriller 365 Days and its sequels, 365 Days: This Day and The Next 365 Days in 2022.

== Early life ==
Morrone was born on 3 October 1990 in Bitonto, Apulia. He is the youngest of four children, and he has three sisters. His mother, Angela, a seamstress, and his father, Natale, a construction worker, were both from Bitonto, but moved to Melegnano, Lombardy when their children were young in order to find better employment opportunities. His father died in 2003, when Morrone was 12 years old.

Morrone decided to become an actor after watching a Harry Potter film at age 11. He began acting in an after school program at his middle school. Morrone repeated his first year of high school after being held back for bad behavior. He then studied professional acting in a theater in the city of Pavia, at the Teatro Fraschini.

== Career ==
=== Acting ===
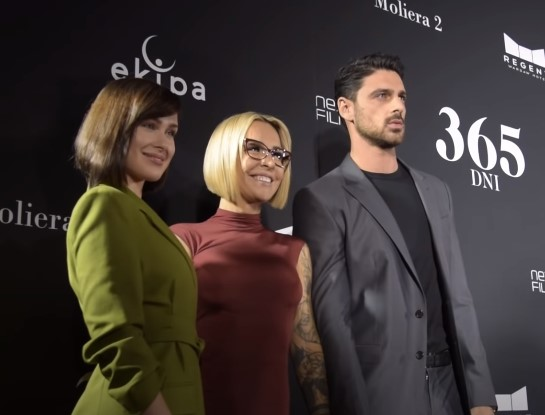
Blanka Lipińska, Anna-Maria Sieklucka, and Michele Morrone in 2019

Morrone's acting career began in 2011 by playing the role of Riccardo in Second Chance, a three-episode web series directed by Piergiorgio Seidita, which was cancelled after one season. He also appeared in a music video by the Italian girl band, Makay, in 2012. After gaining more experience in the field, he started playing lead roles in short films. He acted in Il Tempo di una Sigaretta and E la Vita Continua. He was featured in a drama show titled Che Dio ci Aiuti. His projects include Italian TV series including Come un Delfino (2011), Provaci Ancora (2015), Squadra Antimafia (2015), Sirene (2016), Renata Fonte (2017), Il Processo (The Trial) (2018), and Medici (2018). In 2016, he took part in the eleventh season of the Italian version of Dancing with the Stars (Ballando con le Stelle), where he placed second. In 2019, Morrone played the lead role of Luigi in Bar Giuseppe.

In 2020, Morrone became internationally known after performing the lead role of Massimo Torricelli, a mafia crime boss, in 365 Days. The film was released theatrically in Poland on 7 February 2020 and was subsequently made available on Netflix on 7 June 2020. He signed a three-year contract with the production company and filmed two more films to complete the trilogy.

In 2025, Morrone portrayed Dante Versano in Another Simple Favor.

=== Music ===
Morrone is a professional guitarist and singer. He learned to play guitar at the age of 25 by watching YouTube videos. He released an album titled Dark Room, which has several songs featured in the official 365 Days soundtrack including one of his most famous songs, "Feel It", that has scenes with actress Anna Maria Sieklucka (Laura Biel), from the film, in its music video. The album was released on 14 February 2020 and was produced by label company AGORA S.A.

Morrone joined YouTube on 16 January 2020. He has gained over two million subscribers and 456 million overall views on his channel (as of 24 April 2026). The most viewed video on his channel is the music video of "Hard for me", which has gained 88 million views.

=== Other ventures ===
On 2 August 2020, Morrone launched a women's beachwear clothing brand, AurumRoma. He confirmed the creation of the company via an Instagram live story on 8 August 2020. Shortly after the announcement, the website of the clothing brand crashed due to heavy traffic. Morrone makes his own designs in collaboration with fashion designer Chiara Pollano. The company is owned by Morrone, and run by Spazio Arcó company.

== Personal life ==
Morrone married Rouba Saadeh, a Lebanese stylist, in 2014. The couple had a civil marriage in Italy and Lebanon. They are legally divorced, as he has mentioned in several interviews. They have two sons together, one born in 2014, and the other born in 2017.

== Filmography ==
=== Film ===
Year	Title	Role	Notes	Ref.
2017	Who's the Beast	Peter	Short film	
2018	L'ultimo giorno del toro	Valerio		
2019	Bar Giuseppe	Luigi		
2020	365 Days	Don Massimo Torricelli		
2022	365 Days: This Day	Don Massimo Torricelli / Adriano Torricelli		
2022	The Next 365 Days	Don Massimo Torricelli		
2022	Duetto	Marcello Bianchini		
2024	Subservience	Nick		
2025	Another Simple Favor	Dante Versano		
2025	Home Sweet Home Rebirth	Mek		
2025	The Housemaid	Enzo Accardi		
TBA	Maserati: The Brothers †	Alfieri Maserati	Filming	

=== Television ===
Year	Title	Role	Notes	Ref.
2015	Provaci ancora prof!	Bruno Sacchi	Episode: "Passioni sprecate"	
2017	Sirene	Ares aka Gegè	TV series	
2018	Renata Fonte	Marcello My	Television film	
2019	Medici	Ship Captain	2 episodes	
2019	The Trial	Claudio Cavalleri	8 episodes	
2026	The Gentlemen	Cico Maldini	Episode: "The Road to Kingdom"	

=== Music videos ===
Year	Title	Singer(s)	Label	Ref.
2020	"Hard For Me"	Michele Morrone	Universal Music	
2020	"Hard For Me (Acoustic)"	Michele Morrone	Universal Music	
2020	"Dad (Acoustic)"	Michele Morrone	Universal Music	
2021	"Beautiful"	Michele Morrone	Universal Music	
2022	"Another Day"	Michele Morrone	Universal Music	
2022	"Mud Mud Ke"	Tony Kakkar, Neha Kakkar	Desi Music Factory	
2023	"Push Me"	Michele Morrone	Universal Music	

== Discography ==
=== Studio albums ===
Year	Title	Details	Peak chart positions				
Year	Title	Details	SWI	FR	BE (Wal)	PL	GER
2020	Dark Room	Released: 14 February 2020; Label: Universal Music & Polydor Germany; Format: CD, MP3, LP, digital download, streaming	63	195	178	2	72
2023	Double	Released: 29 September 2023; Label: Universal Music & Polydor Germany; Format: CD, MP3, LP, digital download, streaming	—	—	—	—	—

=== Singles ===
==== Lead artist ====
Title	Year	Peak chart positions			Certification	Album
Title	Year	POL (airplay)	POL (airplay nowości)	RUM (airplay)	Certification	Album
"Feel It"	2020	27	5	72	PMB: Platinum	Dark Room
"Hard For Me"	2020	—	—	—	PMB: Platinum	Dark Room
"Beautiful"	2021	—	—	—		Double
"Another Day"	2022	—	—	—		Double
"Player"	2022	—	—	—		Double
"Angels"	2022	—	—	—		Double
"Push Me"	2023	—	—	—		Double
"Bad Game"	2023	—	—	—		Double
"Sweat Dreams (Are Made Of This)"	2023	—	—	—		Double
"Leave Me (feat. Two Feet)"	2024	—	—	—		
"In My Head"	2024	—	—	—		
"Know My Soul"	2025	—	—	—		
"Unobtainable"	2025	—	—	—		
"—" denotes a recording that did not chart or was not released in that territory.

=== Promotional singles ===
Title	Year	Peak chart positions				Album
Title	Year	BEL (Wal)	POL (airplay)	POR	SWI	Album
"Next"	2020	—	—	—	—	Dark Room
"Dad"	2020	—	—	—	—	Dark Room
"Do It Like That"	2020	—	—	—	—	Dark Room
"Drink Me"	2020	—	—	—	—	Dark Room
"No One Cares"	2020	—	—	—	—	Dark Room
"Dark Room"	2020	—	—	—	—	Dark Room
"Hard For Me"	2020	— (Note: "Hard for Me" did not reach the Ultratop 50 chart, but was registered on the Ultratip chart.)	45	12	68	Dark Room
"Rain In The Hearth"	2020	—	—	—	—	Dark Room
"Watch Me Burn"	2020	—	—	—	—	Dark Room
"—" denotes a recording that did not chart or was not released in that territory.

== Awards and nominations ==
Year	Awards	Category	Work	Result	Ref.
2020	Distinctive International Arab Festivals Awards	—N/a	Himself	Won	
2021	Golden Raspberry Awards	Worst Actor	365 Days	Nominated	
