= Ewa Kasprzyk (actress) =

Polish actress (born 1957)

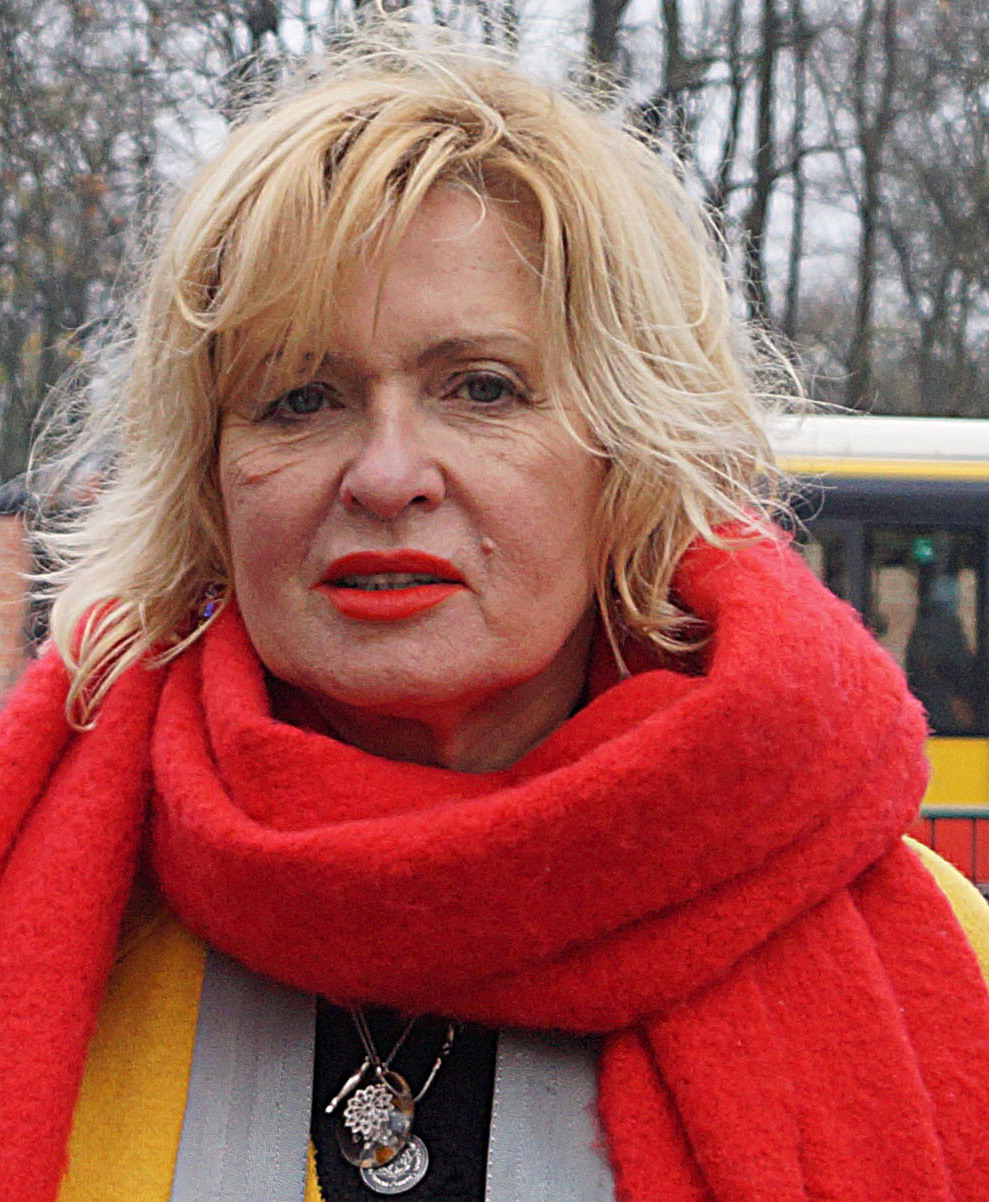
- Kasprzyk in 2019
- Born: 1 January 1957 (age 69); Stargard Szczeciński, Szczecin Voivodeship, Polish People's Republic
- Occupation: Actress
- Years active: 1980–present
- Spouse: Jerzy Bernatowicz (1986–2019)
- Children: 1

Ewa Kasprzyk (born 1 January 1957) is a Polish actress, who has appeared in more than 80 films and television series.

== Life and career ==
Kasprzyk was born in Stargard Szczeciński, Szczecin Voivodeship. On her father's side, she is of Belarusian descent, his family name was Gavrosh and their family came from Baranovichy. She graduated from the AST National Academy of Theatre Arts in Kraków in 1983 and later began performing on stage. Since 2000, Kasprzyk performs in Kwadrat Theatre. She worked with directors such as Kazimierz Kutz, Stanisław Różewicz and Barbara Sass. She made her big screen debut appearing in the 1985 horror-thriller film Medium and later starred in the drama film The Girls of Nowolipki (1985) and its sequel, The Apple Tree of Paradise (1986). She later starred in the comedy films Kogel-mogel (1988) and Galimatias, czyli kogel-mogel II (1989). During the 1990s, Kasprzyk focused on her stage career, rather than films.

In 1996, Kasprzyk was awarded with the Silver Cross of Merit. In 1998, she joined the cast of soap opera, Zlotopolscy as Ilona Clark-Kowalska. She left the soap in 2006. In 2000, she starred as a toxic mother in the drama film Bellissima, for which she received Polish Film Festival Award for Best Actress. She later was regular cast member in a number of series, include Magda M., Na dobre i na złe, Prosto w serce, Friends and L for Love. In 2022, she played Klara Biel in the Netflix films 365 Days: This Day and The Next 365 Days, replacing Grażyna Szapołowska from the first part. For her performance in The Peasants (2023), she was nominated for a Polish Academy Award for Best Supporting Actress.

In 1986, Kasprzyk married Jerzy Bernatowicz, and lived in open relationship until their divorce in 2019. Kasprzyk supports the LGBT rights in Poland.

== Selected filmography ==
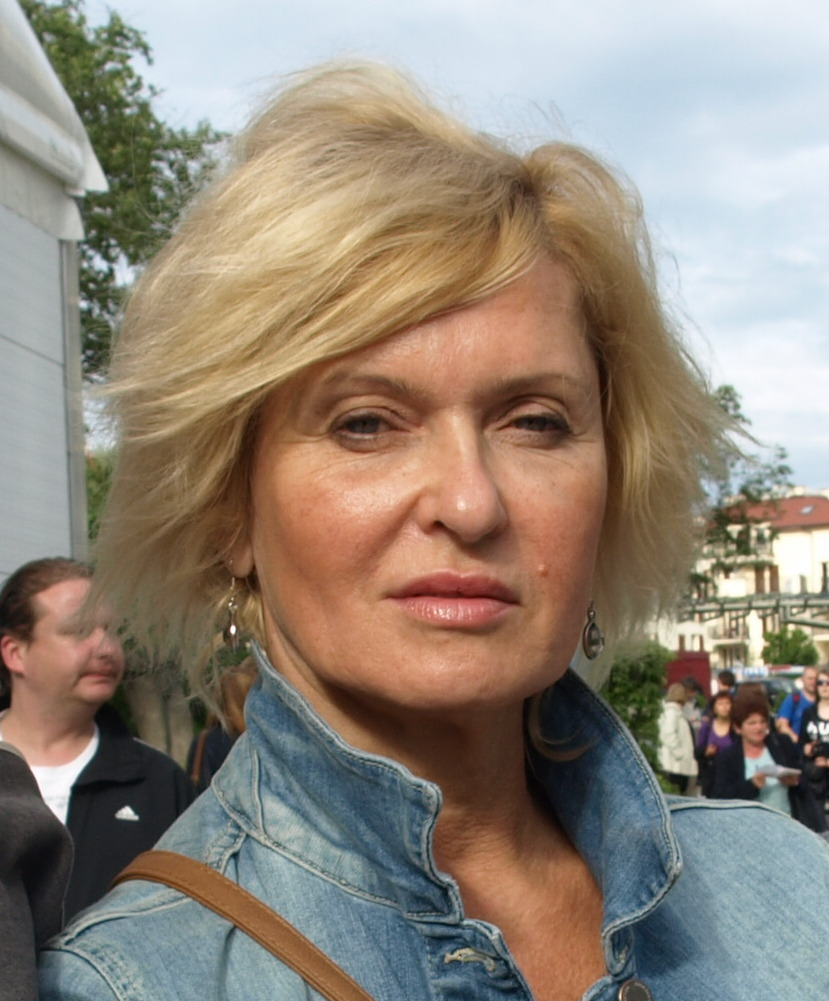
Kasprzyk in 2012

- An Epitaph for Barbara Radziwill (1982)
- Medium (1985)
- The Girls of Nowolipki (1985)
- The Apple Tree of Paradise (1986)
- Kogel-mogel (1988)
- Galimatias, czyli kogel-mogel II (1989)
- Zlotopolscy (1998–2006)
- Career of Nikos Dyzma (2003)
- Magda M. (55 episodes, 2005–2007)
- Na dobre i na złe (63 episodes, 2008–2012)
- Polish-Russian War (2009)
- Prosto w serce (196 episodes, 2011)
- Friends (2012–present)
- L for Love (2018–2021)
- The Plagues of Breslau (2018)
- 365 Days: This Day (2022)
- The Next 365 Days (2022)
- The Peasants (2023)
