= 365 Days (2020 film) =

2020 Polish film by Barbara Białowąs & Tomasz Mandes

- Theatrical release poster
- Polish: 365 Dni
- Directed by: Barbara Białowąs; Tomasz Mandes
- Screenplay by: Tomasz Klimala; Barbara Białowąs; Tomasz Mandes; Blanka Lipińska
- Based on: 365 dni by Blanka Lipińska
- Produced by: Maciej Kawulski; Ewa Lewandowska; Tomasz Mandes
- Starring: Anna-Maria Sieklucka; Michele Morrone; Bronisław Wrocławski; Otar Saralidze; Magdalena Lamparska; Natasza Urbańska
- Cinematography: Mateusz Cierlica
- Edited by: Marcin Drewnowski
- Music by: Michał Sarapata; Mateusz Sarapata
- Production companies: Ekipa Sp. z o.o.; Future Space; Next Film; TVN
- Distributed by: Next Film
- Release date: 7 February 2020 (Poland)
- Running time: 114 minutes
- Country: Poland
- Languages: Polish; Italian; English
- Box office: $9.5 million

365 Days (Polish: 365 dni) is a 2020 Polish erotic thriller film directed by Barbara Białowąs and Tomasz Mandes. Based on the first novel of a trilogy by Blanka Lipińska, the plot follows a young Warsaw woman (Anna-Maria Sieklucka) in a relationship falling for a Sicilian man (Michele Morrone), who imprisons and imposes on her a period of 365 days for her to fall in love with him.

The film was released theatrically in Poland on 7 February 2020 and was later made available on Netflix on 7 June 2020. The film was panned by critics and garnered a rare 0% rating on Rotten Tomatoes. Criticism was directed toward its acting, writing, sex scenes, and romanticization of rape and sexual assault, with many critics drawing unfavorable comparisons to the film Fifty Shades of Grey (2015). It has since been referred to as one of the worst films ever made. However, the film became one of the most watched items in numerous territories on multiple continents, and had one of the longest periods as the most watched item in Netflix's history in the United States.

A sequel, 365 Days: This Day, was released on Netflix on 27 April 2022, also universally panned.

== Plot ==
After a meeting between the Torricelli Sicilian Mafia crime family and black market dealers, Massimo Torricelli watches a beautiful woman named Laura Biel on a beach. Suddenly, the dealers shoot Massimo and his father; Massimo survives while his father dies from his injuries.

Five years later, Massimo is the leader of the Torricelli crime family. In Warsaw, Laura is unhappy in her relationship with her boyfriend, Martin. Laura celebrates her birthday in Italy with Martin, where she gets kidnapped by Massimo.

At his villa, Massimo reveals to Laura who he is and his story. He tells her that when he was injured, all he could think about was her. After searching for years and finally spotting her, he kidnaps her, intending to keep her as a prisoner for 365 days in the hopes that she will fall in love with him. He also promises her that he will not touch her intimately without her consent, even while he is physically and sexually aggressive towards her.

As they spend time together, Laura teases him and refuses to have sex with him. Later, Massimo cuffs her to the bed and makes Laura watch him receive oral sex from another woman. Afterward, he claims he is going to rape her but changes his mind and orders her to get dressed for a club.

At the club, Laura flirts with a man from a rival mafia family, who gropes her. Massimo draws his weapons, and Laura is taken out of the club. The following morning, she awakens on a yacht, where Massimo confesses that he shot the man's hand and incited a gang war between the two families. Laura attempts to apologize, but Massimo blames her for the incident. They argue, and Laura falls into the water. Massimo jumps in to save her. When she regains consciousness, he admits he was scared she might not make it and does not want to lose her. Laura realizes that she has fallen in love with Massimo. The two have sex.

Later that evening, Massimo and Laura attend a masquerade ball, where a woman named Anna threatens Laura. Massimo reveals that he dated Anna, but told her that he would leave if he found Laura, and did so when he recognized Laura at the airport.

After the ball, Massimo and Laura have sex again. He tells her he is sending her to visit her loved ones in Warsaw and promises to join her after finishing up business.

On the car ride to the airport, Domenico, another one of Massimo's mafiosos, tried to reassure a nervous Laura that Anna won't hurt her, but gets a phone call, tells Laura to wait in Warsaw, and rushes away.

In Warsaw, Laura waits for Massimo for days with no contact. She reconnects with her best friend, Olga, and they go clubbing. She runs into Martin, who says he has been looking for her. He attempts to convince her to reconcile and follows her back to her apartment, where Massimo is unexpectedly waiting. Martin leaves, and Laura and Massimo have sex. When Laura opens his shirt, she discovers his wounds from the ongoing conflict. The following morning, Massimo proposes, and she accepts. However, she asks him to keep his "occupation" a secret from her parents.

Back in Italy, Mario informs Massimo of rising tensions. Laura mentions feeling unwell but brushes off seeing a doctor. They discuss their upcoming wedding, which her family is not allowed to attend, as she does not want them to discover what Massimo does. However, Massimo allows Olga to come as Laura's bridesmaid. When Olga visits, Laura reveals she is pregnant. Olga urges her to tell Massimo about the pregnancy. Meanwhile, Massimo's associate Mario receives a phone call from a Torricelli informant that the rival mafia family is about to kill Laura. Laura's car enters a tunnel but does not come out the other side. Mario rushes to find Massimo just as Laura's call drops. Realizing the implications, Massimo breaks down.

== Cast ==
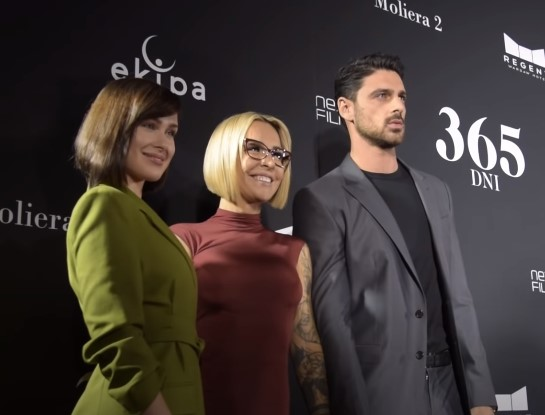
Anna Maria Sieklucka, Blanka Lipińska, and Michele Morrone in 2019

- Anna-Maria Sieklucka as Laura Biel
- Michele Morrone as Don Massimo Toricelli
- Bronisław Wrocławski as Mario
- Otar Saralidze as Domenico
- Magdalena Lamparska as Olga
- Natasza Urbańska as Anna
- Grażyna Szapołowska as Klara Biel, Laura's mother
- Tomasz Stockinger as Tomasz Biel, Laura's father
- Gianni Parisi as Massimo's father
- Mateusz Łasowski as Martin
- Blanka Lipińska as a bride

== Production ==
The film scenes were primarily shot in Poland (Warsaw, Kraków and Niepołomice) and in Italy (Sanremo).

== Soundtrack ==
The film's theme song, "Feel It", along with the songs "Watch Me Burn", "Dark Room" and "Hard for Me", are sung by Morrone. The songs "I See Red", "Give 'Em Hell" and "Wicked Ways" were sung by Everybody Loves an Outlaw, a.k.a. Bonnie and Taylor Sims. "I See Red" made #1 on Spotify's Viral 50 chart in the US, with "Hard for Me" also in the top 5. Morrone and Everybody Loves an Outlaw entered the top 10 of Rolling Stone's Breakthrough 25 Chart.

== Release ==
365 Days was released in Poland on 7 February 2020, grossing $9 million. In the United Kingdom, the film received a limited theatrical release on 14 February 2020, and grossed $494,181, before premiering on Netflix in June 2020.

== Reception ==
365 Days made the top three most viewed items on Netflix in numerous countries. It was the first movie to have two multiday periods as Netflix's #1 movie in the US: it was #1 for 4 days, then replaced in that position by Da 5 Bloods, but then, 3 days later, returned to #1. The film has thus had 10 days as #1, the second highest in the chart's history.

365 Days drew parallels with the 2015 erotic drama Fifty Shades of Grey. It was criticised for romanticising kidnapping and rape. Review aggregator website Rotten Tomatoes collected 16 reviews and identified 0% of them as positive, with an average rating of 1.9/10.

Jessica Kiang of Variety described the film as "a thoroughly terrible, politically objectionable, occasionally hilarious Polish humpathon". The Guardian, after citing other media – "Variety called it 'dumber-than-hair'. Cosmopolitan labelled it 'the worst thing I've ever seen'" – highlights the film's "dismal dialogue", poor character development and "unsexy" sex scenes.

Filmmaker Gaspar Noe was critical of the film, saying: "There is also that very stupid Polish movie that was number one. It's because people need to masturbate. They have a penis or... the other way around." he explains. "They just need to play with their toys."

On June 17, 2020, Collectif Soeurcières, a French feminist collective, started an online petition through Change.org, addressing Netflix France, to pull the film from streaming availability. As of August 16, it gained 40,000 signatures. On July 2, 2020, singer Duffy wrote an open letter, addressing Netflix CEO Reed Hastings, criticizing the film for glamorizing sexual violence. "This should not be anyone's idea of entertainment, nor should it be described as such, or be commercialized in this manner", she said. After this, another Change.org petition, initiated by social media influencer Mikayla Zazon, gained over 70,000 signatures. On July 8, 2020, PTC president Timothy F. Winter requested Netflix to remove the film from the platform.

=== Accolades ===
Awards and nominations for 365 Days
Award	Date of ceremony	Category	Recipients, comments	Result	Ref.
Golden Raspberry Awards	24 April 2021	Worst Picture	Maciej Kawulski, Ewa Lewandowska and Tomasz Mandes	Nominated	
Golden Raspberry Awards	24 April 2021	Worst Director	Barbara Białowąs and Tomasz Mandes	Nominated	
Golden Raspberry Awards	24 April 2021	Worst Actor	Michele Morrone	Nominated	
Golden Raspberry Awards	24 April 2021	Worst Actress	Anna-Maria Sieklucka	Nominated	
Golden Raspberry Awards	24 April 2021	Worst Screenplay	Tomasz Klimala and Barbara Białowąs & Tomasz Mandes and Blanka Lipińska; Based on the novel by Blanka Lipińska	Won	
Golden Raspberry Awards	24 April 2021	Worst Prequel, Remake, Rip-off or Sequel		Nominated	
Polish Snake Award	24 April 2021	Worst Film, Worst Screenplay, Worst Actors' Duo	for a "dive of libido down that would make the world's greatest parachutist, Felix Baumgartner, proud	Won	

== Sequels ==
Plans for a sequel, titled This Day, were delayed due to the COVID-19 pandemic. In May 2021, it was reported that Netflix had started filming two sequels concurrently, with several cast members returning. Morrone, Sieklucka and Lamparska were confirmed to be returning. The titles of the sequels were referred to as 365 Days Part 2 and 365 Days Part 3. The second movie, retitled to 365 Days: This Day, premiered on Netflix on April 27, 2022. The third movie, retitled to The Next 365 Days, premiered on August 19, 2022.

== See also ==
- List of 21st century films considered the worst
