= Anna-Maria Sieklucka =

Polish actress

- Sieklucka in 2025
- Born: Lublin, Poland
- Education: AST National Academy of Theatre Arts (Wrocław faculty)
- Occupation: Actress
- Years active: 2019–present

Anna-Maria Sieklucka ([ɕɛˈklut͡ska] sheh-KLOO-tska) is a Polish actress. She is best known for her leading role as Laura Biel in the erotic romantic drama film 365 Days (2020) and its sequels.

== Early life ==
Sieklucka was born in Lublin, the largest city in eastern Poland. Her father, Jerzy Antoni Sieklucki, is a lawyer. She studied at the Wrocław-based Faculty of Puppetry of AST National Academy of Theatre Arts and graduated in 2018. She speaks fluent Polish, English, French, and German.

== Career ==
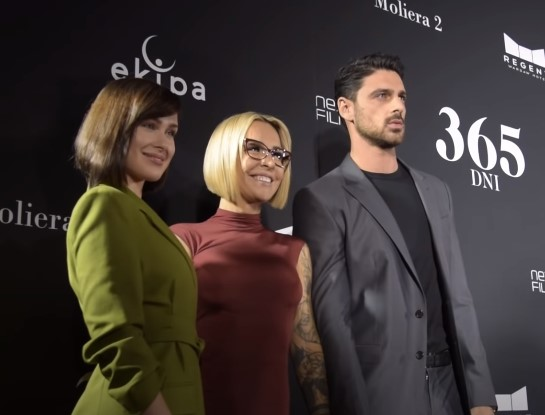
Blanka Lipińska, Anna-Maria Sieklucka, and Michele Morrone in 2019

In October 2019, she appeared in one episode of the Polish television series Na dobre i na złe, focused around the life of paramedics and hospital staff.

She made her film debut playing Laura Biel, opposite Michele Morrone, in the erotic drama film 365 Days (2020) and the sequel. She described filming as a challenge, and was initially hesitant to accept the role after reading the script. The movie was met with very negative critical reception but was popular in many countries all over the world, according to Newsweek it was the most-watched Netflix film in 2020. Sieklucka was widely panned and nominated for a Golden Raspberry Award for Worst Actress for her performance. She reprised the role in two sequels that were met with even more negative reception. With all three films receiving a rare 0% on Rotten Tomatoes.

== Filmography ==
=== Film ===
Year	Title	Role	Notes
2020	365 Days	Laura Biel	
2022	365 Days: This Day	Laura Torricelli	
2022	The Next 365 Days	Laura Torricelli	
2024	Compulsion	Evie	

Key
†	Denotes films that have not yet been released

=== Television ===
Year	Title	Role	Notes
2019	Na dobre i na złe	Aniela Grabek	Episode: "Jutro będziemy szczęśliwi"
2021	Twoja twarz brzmi znajomo	Contestant	Season 14: 7th place
2024	Dancing with the Stars. Taniec z gwiazdami	Contestant	Season 28: 7th place
