= Blanka Lipińska =

Polish writer

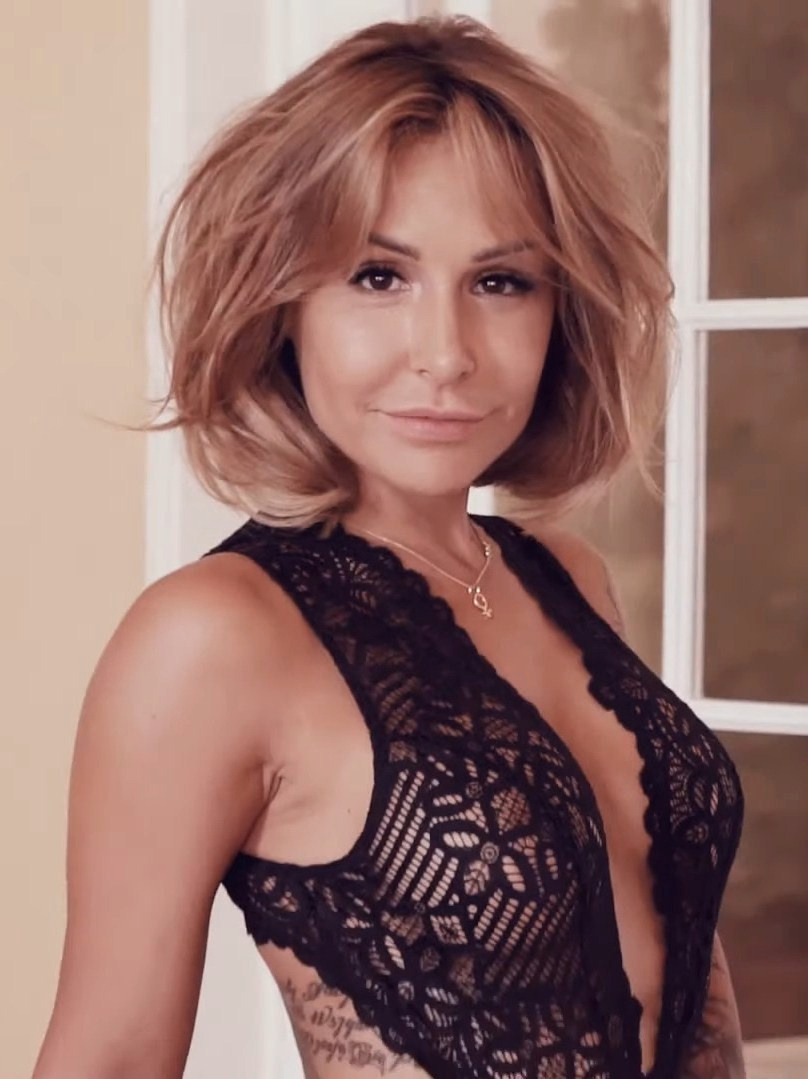
- Lipińska in 2019
- Born: 22 July 1985 (age 41); Puławy, Poland
- Occupation: Novelist
- Writing career
- Genre: Erotic fiction
- Notable work: 365 Dni trilogy

Blanka Marta Lipińska (born 22 July 1985) is a Polish author best known for her erotic trilogy beginning with 365 Dni (365 Days). The novels of the trilogy were adapted into films, for which she co-wrote the screenplay and in which she has a cameo.

== Biography ==
She was born in Puławy, southeastern Poland, to Małgorzata and Grzegorz Lipiński. After graduating from high school, she has finished cosmetology post-secondary school. In 2012, she joined KSW, the premier mixed martial arts organization in Poland, and was involved in the recruitment and training of the ring girls.

In 2016, she moved to Poznań. The following year she moved to El Gouna, Egypt before returning to Warsaw in 2018. In 2018, she published her highly popular erotic novel 365 Days, which she had written four years earlier. In 2020, she became the host of a reality TV show Tylko jeden aired on Polsat. In 2021 and 2022, she was involved in the film adaptations of her books by Netflix.

Prior to becoming an author, Lipińska worked as a therapist-hypnotist. She enjoys sports and fitness as well as sailing. She has several tattoos including depictions of her parents and brother.

== Recognition ==
In 2020, she was ranked among the "50 most influential Polish women" by the Wprost magazine.

From 2020 to 2023, she appeared on the list of the Best Female Personal Brands compiled by Polish edition of Forbes Women magazine.

Between 2019–2021, she was featured on the list of the most popular authors in Poland compiled by the National Library of Poland.

Katarzyna Hanik, in her review of the contemporary Polish prose, described Lipińska as an "exceptionally controversial figure", who chose an image of a provocative person. Readers were divided over her novels and as of 2022, she was among the most recognizable writers in Poland. Her commercial success helped her to shape her image. Hanik cites other critics, who note that her image is a mix of a businesswoman-type writer and that of the woman who fights for the liberation of other women from the unnecessary prudery.

== Works ==
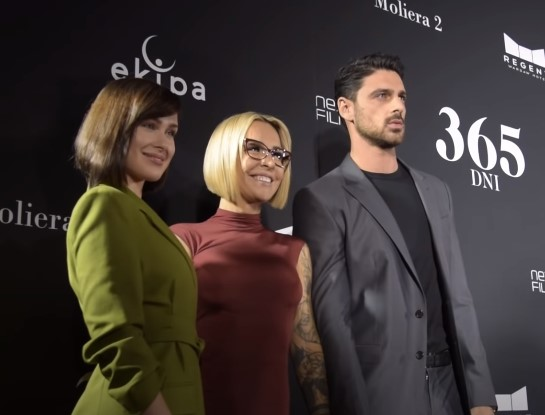
Blanka Lipińska, Anna-Maria Sieklucka, and Michele Morrone in 2019

Lipińska's three books are part of a trilogy. They were first published in Polish. An English translation of the first book was released in January 2021, with the second, That Day, in 2022. The events in all three books occur within a few months of each other. Lipińska said that the inspiration for her erotic trilogy was Fifty Shades of Grey and a personal holiday trip to Sicily. She has described the works as semi-autobiographical.

- 365 dni, Wydawnictwo Edipresse Polska, Warszawa 2018
  - 365 Days (English edition), 2021
  - The 2020 Polish erotic thriller film 365 Days was based on the novel, screenplay by Tomasz Klimala, Barbara Bialowas, Tomasz Mandes, and Blanka Lipińska
- Ten dzień, Wydawnictwo Edipresse Polska, Warszawa 2018
  - 365 Days-This Day (English edition), 2021
  - The 2022 film 365 Days: This Day was released on Netflix
- Kolejne 365 dni, Wydawnictwo Agora, Warszawa 2019
  - The 2022 film The Next 365 Days, was released on Netflix
