= 365 Days: This Day =

2022 Polish film by Barbara Białowąs & Tomasz Mandes

- Official release poster
- Polish: 365 dni: Ten dzień
- Directed by: Barbara Białowąs; Tomasz Mandes
- Screenplay by: Tomasz Klimala; Barbara Białowąs; Tomasz Mandes; Blanka Lipińska
- Based on: Ten Dzień by Blanka Lipińska
- Produced by: Tomasz Mandes
- Starring: Anna-Maria Sieklucka; Michele Morrone; Magdalena Lamparska
- Cinematography: Bartek Cierlica
- Edited by: Marcin Drewnowski
- Music by: Dominic Buczkowski-Wojtaszek; Patryk Kumór
- Production companies: Ekipa; Open Mind One
- Distributed by: Netflix
- Release date: 27 April 2022
- Running time: 109 minutes
- Country: Poland
- Languages: Polish; English; Italian; Spanish

365 Days: This Day (Polish: 365 dni: Ten dzień) is a 2022 Polish erotic drama film directed by Barbara Białowąs and Tomasz Mandes. Serving as a sequel to 365 Days, it is based on This Day, the second novel of a trilogy by Blanka Lipińska and stars Anna-Maria Sieklucka, Michele Morrone and Magdalena Lamparska.

The film was released worldwide on Netflix on 27 April 2022; like its predecessor, it was universally panned. A sequel, The Next 365 Days, was released on 19 August 2022, panned as well.

== Plot ==
The movie starts with Massimo and Laura getting married. Laura had lost her baby due to the accident that took place in the final scenes of the previous movie.

Only Laura's best friend, Olga, travels to Italy to attend the wedding, as Massimo fears he would not be able to hide his identity as a mafioso from Laura's family were they to come for the wedding. Laura divulges her miscarriage to Olga, but never plans to tell Massimo, fearing a vendetta.

Laura and Massimo go on their honeymoon for a few days. On their return, they find Olga and his right-hand man Domenico in a compromising position, as the two had been flirting during the wedding festivities.

The newlyweds are happy until Laura starts feeling bored, as she has nothing to do while Massimo is busy with his work. Daily arguments turn her mind to Nacho, Massimo's gardener. One night at a party in their house, Laura believes she sees Massimo having sex with his ex-girlfriend, Anna. Heartbroken, she leaves the party, where she encounters Nacho. They flee together to an island.

Meanwhile, Massimo is confused about what happened and starts searching for Laura. She starts enjoying her life on the island, and at the same time, she has dreams about having sex with Nacho.

One day, Nacho tells Laura to meet his father who is the head of the rival mafia gang of Massimo. She is shocked and feels betrayed, but still accompanies Nacho to his father's place. Laura is left with a few guards, and Nacho goes to meet his father.

Massimo is having an argument with Nacho's father, who believes Adriano, Massimo's estranged and unstable twin brother, would be a better replacement for the Sicilian mob family, and it is revealed that they have Laura with them. Suddenly, Nacho realizes that he left Laura with the wrong guards and he and Massimo rush to save her.

Meanwhile, Laura is being held by Adriano, whom she had no prior knowledge of. It is then revealed that Laura saw Adriano having sex with Anna earlier, and mistook him for her husband, Massimo.

Massimo and Nacho, who had always been rivals, enter the place to try to save Laura. Adriano reveals that in the incident in the tunnel, Laura miscarried their baby. She runs and is shot by Anna and Adriano, who are in turn shot and killed by Massimo and Nacho. The movie ends with Nacho leaving and Laura lying in the arms of Massimo, her fate uncertain.

== Cast ==
- Anna-Maria Sieklucka as Laura Torricelli (née Biel)
- Michele Morrone as Don Massimo Torricelli and Adriano Torricelli (Don Massimo's twin brother)
- Magdalena Lamparska as Olga
- Otar Saralidze as Domenico
- Simone Susinna as Nacho
- Natasza Urbańska as Anna
- Ewa Kasprzyk as Klara Biel

== Production ==
Principal photography began in May 2021, in areas around Italy and Poland, with Anna-Maria Sieklucka and Magdalena Lamparska reprising their roles from the first film. Production was originally scheduled to begin in 2020, in Sicily and Poland, but was delayed due to the COVID-19 pandemic. In February 2021, Michele Morrone was also confirmed to be reprising his role.

== Soundtrack ==
Lp.	Title	Author
1.	"365 Days"	EMO & Marissa
2.	"Ave Maria"	Franz Schubert
3.	"My Girl"	Oskar Cyms
4.	"On It"	EMO
5.	"Mi Amor"	J. J. Abel, gościnnie: Carla Fernandes
6.	"If U Like That"	Marissa
7.	"City of Sand"	Adam Peters
8.	"Don’t Mess with My Mind"	EMO
9.	"It Feels Like Home"	Nairobiee, Kurt Karver, Jim Lord, Aldous Finch
10.	"Nothing To Lose"	Marien
11.	"You Were in Love"	Bryska
12.	"All I Want Is You for Christmas"	The Fun Machine
13.	"XMAS"	Ian Scott
14.	"Promises"	EMO
15.	"Trouble Maker"	Marien
16.	"Voices Of Spring"	Royal Philharmonic Orchestra, Peter Guth
17.	"Strauss: Wine, Women & Song"	Royal Philharmonic Orchestra, Peter Guth
18.	"Quintessence"	Bleeding Fingers Music
19.	"Secrets"	Natalia Krakowiak
20.	"Aprile"	Compagnia D’Opera Italiana, Antonello Gotta, Stefano Secco
21.	"Complicated"	Ian Scott
22.	"Give Me Some Love"	Tynsky
23.	"Eyes On Target"	Nexus Trix, Red Earth
24.	"Good To Me"	EMO
25.	"Winter Summer"	Jhn McFly, feat. Tynsky
26.	"Dos Horas"	J. J. Abel, feat. Daniel Rondon & Kuinvi
27.	"By Your Side"	Marissa
28.	"Show Me"	Ian Scott
29.	"Never Again"	Tommy Docherty
30.	"Be Mine (Remix)"	Naomi August
31.	"The Calling (EPIX Remix)"	The Rigs
32.	"The End"	Marissa
33.	"EMO"	Marissa
34.	"Another Day"	Michele Morrone
35.	"I Don't Care"	DJ Khalil

== Release ==
365 Days: This Day was released on 27 April 2022 on Netflix.

== Reception ==
On the review aggregator website Rotten Tomatoes, 0% of 17 critics' reviews are positive. Metacritic, which uses a weighted average, assigned the film a score of 8 out of 100, based on five critics, indicating "overwhelming dislike".

Jonathan Wilson, of Ready Steady Cut, gave the film a negative review, saying how the film, alongside other erotic films, had "deeply unhealthy depictions of sex and relationships that glamorize and justify various forms of controlling abuse and domination", and there was only 15 minutes of plot in the film, if the sex montages, which comprised 80% of the film, were taken out. Jessica Kiang, of Variety, said the film "is piping hot trash". Kate Erbland, of IndieWire, also gave a negative review, saying "most audiences who tune into 365 Days: This Day are likely not seeking out female empowerment tales or coherent plots, but the disdain with which the film treats both its viewers and its star can't help but grate." Oli Welsh, of Polygon, said "as difficult as it might be to believe, it's even worse than the first movie. But it goes down easier, because much of the first film's ugly side has been smoothed away." Shaun Munro, of Flickering Myth, gave the film a 1 out of 5, saying "this blandly horny sequel tries in vain to distance itself from its predecessor's icky foundations, and while its sub-telenovela plot is outrageous enough to be perversely entertaining, by any standard metric it's truly terrible stuff."

== Sequel ==
Plans for a sequel, titled The Next 365 Days, were delayed due to the COVID-19 pandemic. In May 2021, it was reported that Netflix had started filming The Next 365 Days concurrently with This Day. Morrone, Sieklucka, and Lamparska were all confirmed to return. The film was released on 19 August 2022.
