= The Next 365 Days =

2022 Polish film by Barbara Białowąs & Tomasz Mandes

- Official release poster
- Polish: Kolejne 365 dni
- Directed by: Barbara Białowąs; Tomasz Mandes
- Screenplay by: Mojca Tirš; Blanka Lipińska; Tomasz Mandes
- Based on: Kolejne 365 dni by Blanka Lipińska
- Produced by: Ewa Lewandowska; Tomasz Mandes; Maciej Kawulski
- Starring: Anna-Maria Sieklucka; Michele Morrone; Simone Susinna; Magdalena Lamparska; Otar Saralidze
- Cinematography: Bartek Cierlica
- Edited by: Marcin Drewnowski
- Music by: Patryk Kumór; Dominic Buczkowski-Wojtaszek
- Production companies: Open Mind One; Ekipa
- Distributed by: Netflix
- Release date: 19 August 2022
- Running time: 113 minutes
- Country: Poland
- Languages: Polish; English; Italian

The Next 365 Days (Polish: Kolejne 365 dni) is a 2022 Polish erotic drama film directed by Barbara Białowąs and Tomasz Mandes. Serving as a sequel to 365 Days: This Day (2022), it is based on the third novel of a trilogy by Blanka Lipińska, and stars Anna-Maria Sieklucka, Michele Morrone, Simone Susinna, Magdalena Lamparska and Otar Saralidze.

As with its predecessors, the film was universally panned.

== Plot ==
Massimo visits the grave of his twin brother, Adriano, who was killed during the final events of the previous film. He then checks on Laura, who survived and is recovering from Anna and Adriano's attack. Despite the doctor recommending no intimacy until she has time to heal, the sexually frustrated Laura seduces Massimo during one of his business meetings.

Later, while relaxing with her best friend Olga, Laura muses on her miraculous survival and wonders what she would do with her second chance. She then receives a phone call from Nacho, who apologizes for lying to her and says that he cannot stop thinking about her. Laura rebuffs him but admits to Olga that, despite being married, she is struggling with her strong attraction to Massimo's rival.

The friends go to a club to unwind, and Laura later meets up with Massimo, and they have sex after watching a private strip performance. However, Massimo is still troubled by Laura's previous escape with Nacho to a private island and accuses her of cheating on him; he is still upset she had not told him about her pregnancy. Laura accuses his family of being the reason that she lost her baby.

The next morning, Massimo tries to reconcile with Laura by having sex, but she begins to imagine Nacho instead, and he stops when he realizes that she is distracted. He goes to a kink club with his associates but does not cheat on Laura.

Upset at the prospect of her marriage falling apart, Laura keeps busy by advancing her career in fashion and being a brand ambassador. She and Olga are invited to the Lagos Fashion Fair, so they travel to Portugal, where Nacho is coincidentally staying for a surfing competition.

Laura attempts to avoid Nacho but cannot stop having intense sexual dreams about him. Eventually, they encounter each other at a club where the fashion show is taking place, and after sharing a conversation, Laura kisses him, and they eventually have sex on the beach.

Nacho reveals that he saved Massimo's life because he knew Laura loved him, and though he is also in love with her, he will wait for her and not force her to be with him. Laura returns to her hotel, where a furious Massimo confronts her over her behavior. She threatens divorce and requests space, and Massimo complies.

Laura returns to Poland to be reunited with her parents and admits she is not sure who she is truly in love with. Her mother observes that it is almost her 30th birthday, which means that it has been almost a year since she first met Massimo, and encourages her daughter to prioritize her own happiness.

Laura later dreams of a threesome with Massimo and Nacho. She gets a call from Olga, who warns her that Massimo knows of her affair with Nacho, and Olga worries that Massimo will murder her. A calm Laura decides that she must return to Sicily to meet Massimo.

When Laura arrives, she realizes that Nacho has posed as her chauffeur. He explains that his feelings for her were not love at first sight but love that grew from friendship, and he implores her to be with him. Laura says that she needs time to think, and Nacho once more agrees to wait.

Laura meets with Massimo on the beach. He is apologetic about his earlier controlling behavior and for not being available to support her after she lost their baby. When Laura brings up her affair with Nacho, Massimo explains that his father taught him about the value of not forcing love. He asks for her decision about which man she will choose, but Laura does not answer.

== Cast ==
- Anna-Maria Sieklucka as Laura Torricelli
- Michele Morrone as Massimo Torricelli
- Simone Susinna as Nacho
- Magdalena Lamparska as Olga
- Otar Saralidze as Domenico
- Ewa Kasprzyk as Klara Biel
- Dariusz Jakubowski as Tomasz Biel
- Ramón Langa as Don Fernando Matos
- Tomasz Mandes as Tommaso
- Natalia Siwiec as Emily
- Karolina Pisarek as Amelia

== Production ==
Filming was set to begin in 2021, in areas around Italy and Poland, with Anna-Maria Sieklucka and Magdalena Lamparska reprising their roles from the first two films. Michele Morrone was also confirmed to reprise his role.

== Release ==
The Next 365 Days was released on 19 August 2022 on Netflix.

== Reception ==
On review aggregator Rotten Tomatoes, the film has a 0% approval rating based on 6 reviews.
