= 1994 Stinkers Bad Movie Awards =

Award ceremony presented by the Stinkers Bad Movie Awards in 1994

17th Stinkers Bad Movie Awards
- Date: 1995

Highlights
- Worst Film: North
- Most awards: North (2)
- Most nominations: The Specialist (4)

The 17th Stinkers Bad Movie Awards were released by the Hastings Bad Cinema Society in 1995 to honour the worst films the film industry had to offer in 1994. Founder Mike Lancaster put Ready to Wear as the one 1994 film among his five worst movies of the 1990s, alongside It's Pat, Kids, Lost in Space, and Nothing but Trouble. Listed as follows are the different categories with their respective winners and nominees, including Worst Picture and its dishonourable mentions, which are films that were considered for Worst Picture but ultimately failed to make the final ballot (30 total). All winners are highlighted.

== Winners and Nominees ==
=== Worst Picture ===
Film	Production company(s)
North	Columbia
Cabin Boy	Touchstone Pictures
Car 54, Where Are You?	MGM, United Artists, Orion Pictures
Natural Born Killers	Warner Bros.
The Specialist	Warner Bros.

==== Dishonourable Mentions ====
- Ace Ventura: Pet Detective (Warner Bros.)
- Airheads (Fox)
- Beverly Hills Cop III (Paramount)
- Blankman (Columbia)
- City Slickers II (Columbia)
- Color of Night (Hollywood)
- The Cowboy Way (Universal)
- Dumb and Dumber (New Line)
- Even Cowgirls Get the Blues (Fine Line)
- Exit to Eden (Savoy)
- The Flintstones (Universal)
- Frankenstein (a.k.a. Mary Shelley's Frankenstein) (TriStar)
- The Getaway (Universal)
- Getting Even With Dad (MGM)
- Highlander III: The Final Dimension (Miramax)
- I'll Do Anything (Columbia)
- Intersection (Paramount)
- Interview with the Vampire (Warner Bros.)
- Lightning Jack (Savoy)
- Little Indian, Big City (Buena Vista)
- Love Affair (Warner Bros.)
- Major League II (Warner Bros.)
- Mixed Nuts (TriStar)
- On Deadly Ground (Warner Bros.)
- The Pagemaster (Fox)
- Pulp Fiction (Miramax)
- Ready to Wear (a.k.a. Prêt-à-Porter) (Miramax)
- Richie Rich (Warner Bros.)
- The Swan Princess (New Line)
- Wyatt Earp (Warner Bros.)

=== Other Categories ===
Worst Actor: Bruce Willis for Color of Night and North; Macaulay Culkin for Getting Even With Dad, The Pagemaster, and Richie Rich; Woody Harrelson for Natural Born Killers; Sylvester Stallone for The Specialist; Rod Steiger for The Specialist	Worst Actress: Sharon Stone for Intersection and The Specialist; Kim Basinger for The Getaway; Jane March for Color of Night; Rosie O'Donnell for Car 54, Where Are You?, Exit to Eden, and The Flintstones; Elizabeth Taylor for The Flintstones
Worst Sequel: Major League II (Warner Bros.); Beverly Hills Cop III (Paramount); City Slickers II (Columbia)	The Sequel Nobody Was Clamoring For: The Next Karate Kid (Columbia); Highlander III: The Final Dimension (Miramax); Major League II (Warner Bros.)
Worst Resurrection of a TV Show: Car 54, Where Are You? (MGM/United Artists, Orion); The Flintstones (Universal)	The Founders Award - What Were They Thinking and Why?: I'll Do Anything (Columbia); Ready to Wear (a.k.a. Prêt-à-Porter) (Miramax)
