= 15th Golden Raspberry Awards =

Award for worst cinematic under-achievements in 1994

- Date: March 26, 1995
- Site: El Rey Hotel, Los Angeles, California

Highlights
- Worst Picture: Color of Night
- Most awards: The Specialist (2), Wyatt Earp (2), The Flintstones (2), and Naked Gun 33 1/3: The Final Insult (2)
- Most nominations: Color of Night (9)

The 15th Golden Raspberry Awards were held on March 26, 1995, at the El Rey Hotel in Los Angeles, California, to recognize the worst the movie industry had to offer in 1994. The erotic thriller Color of Night became the first (and so far only) Golden Raspberry Worst Picture "winner" to not receive a single other Razzie (out of eight other nominations). Thumbelina became the first animated film to be nominated for and win a Razzie, which it received for Worst Original Song. The Specialist, Wyatt Earp, The Flintstones and Naked Gun 33 1/3: The Final Insult each took home two awards, even though the latter two were not nominated for Worst Picture.

== Awards and nominations ==
Winner (in bold)
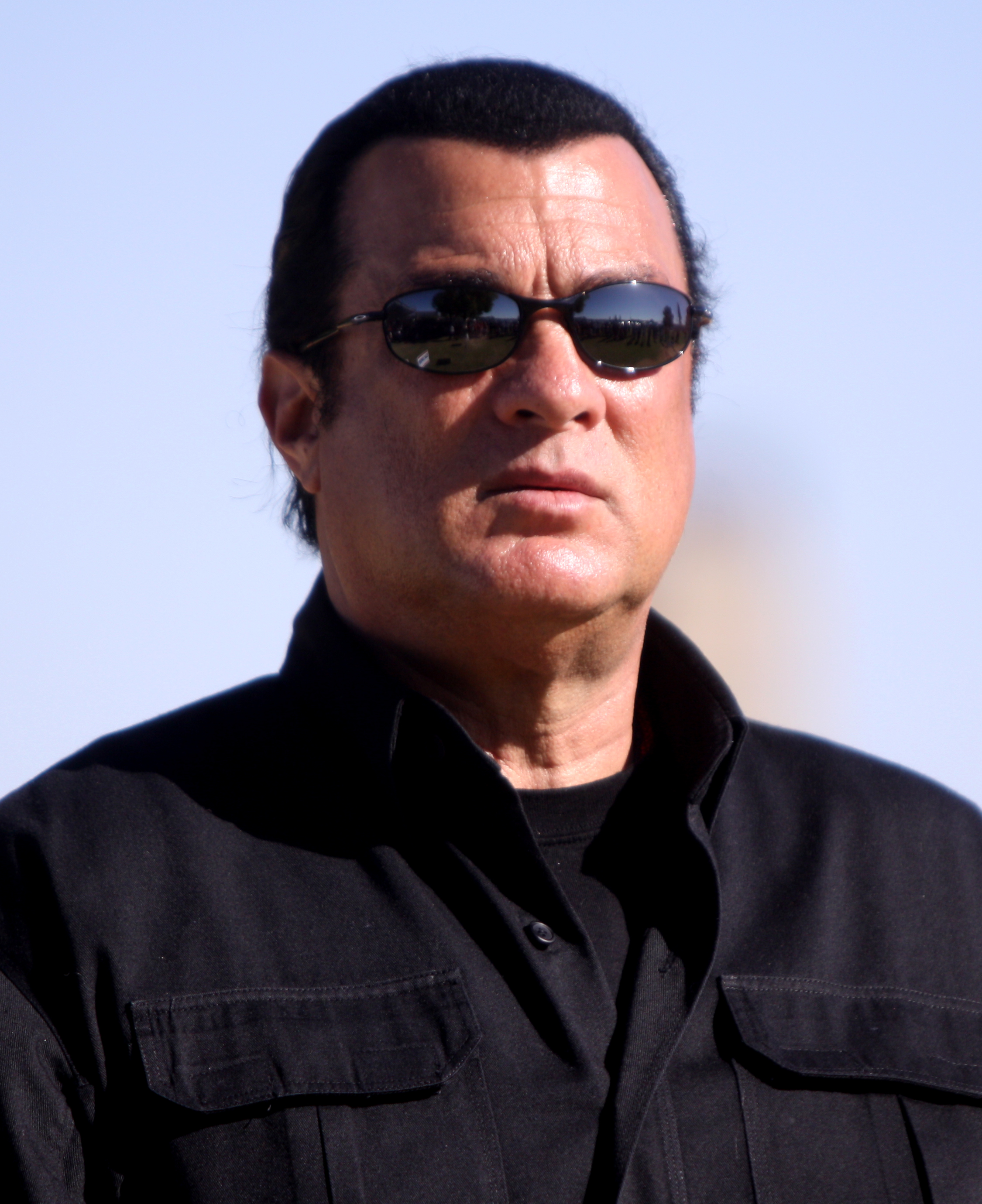
Steven Seagal, Worst Director winner.

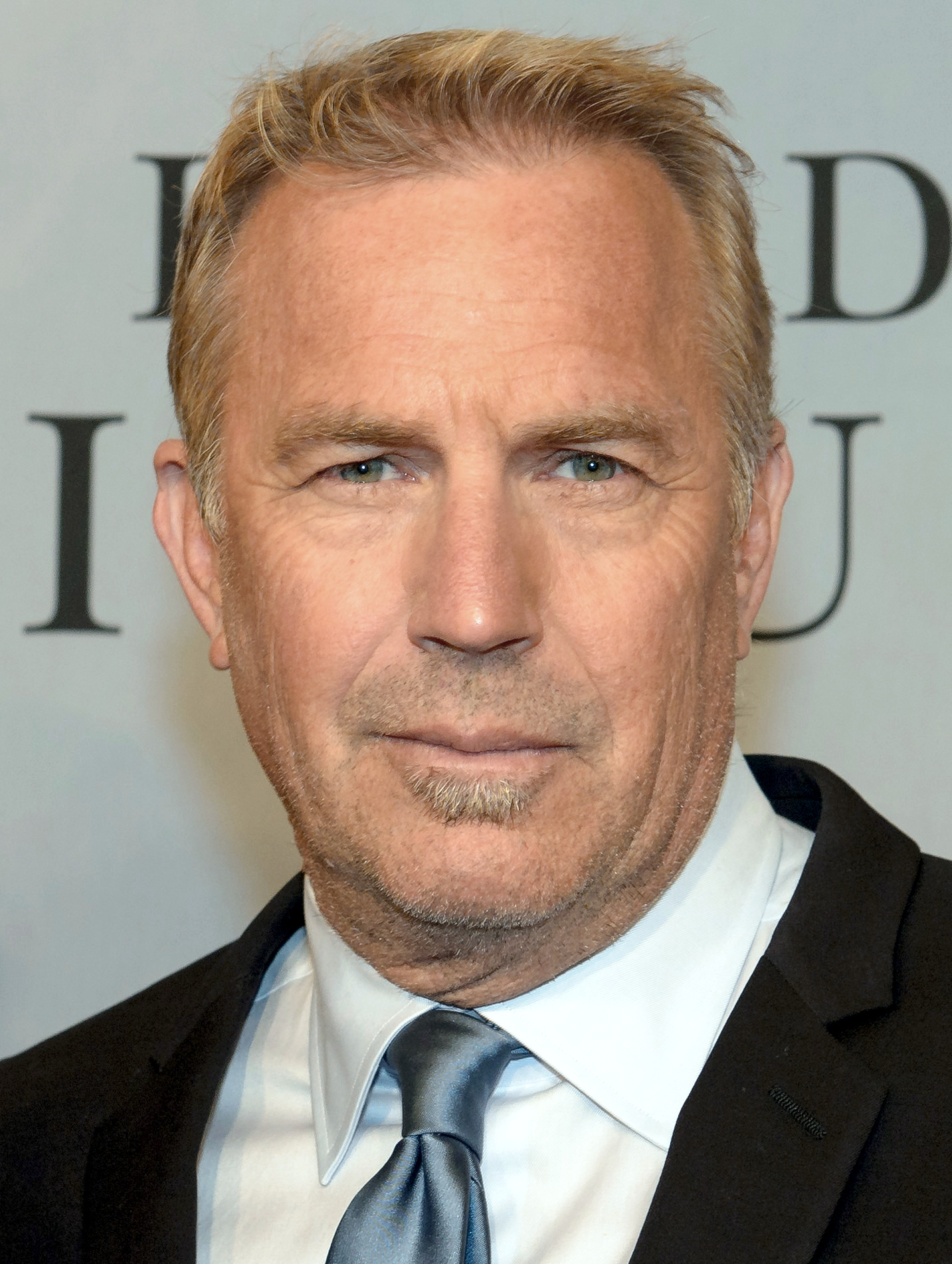
Kevin Costner, Worst Actor winner.

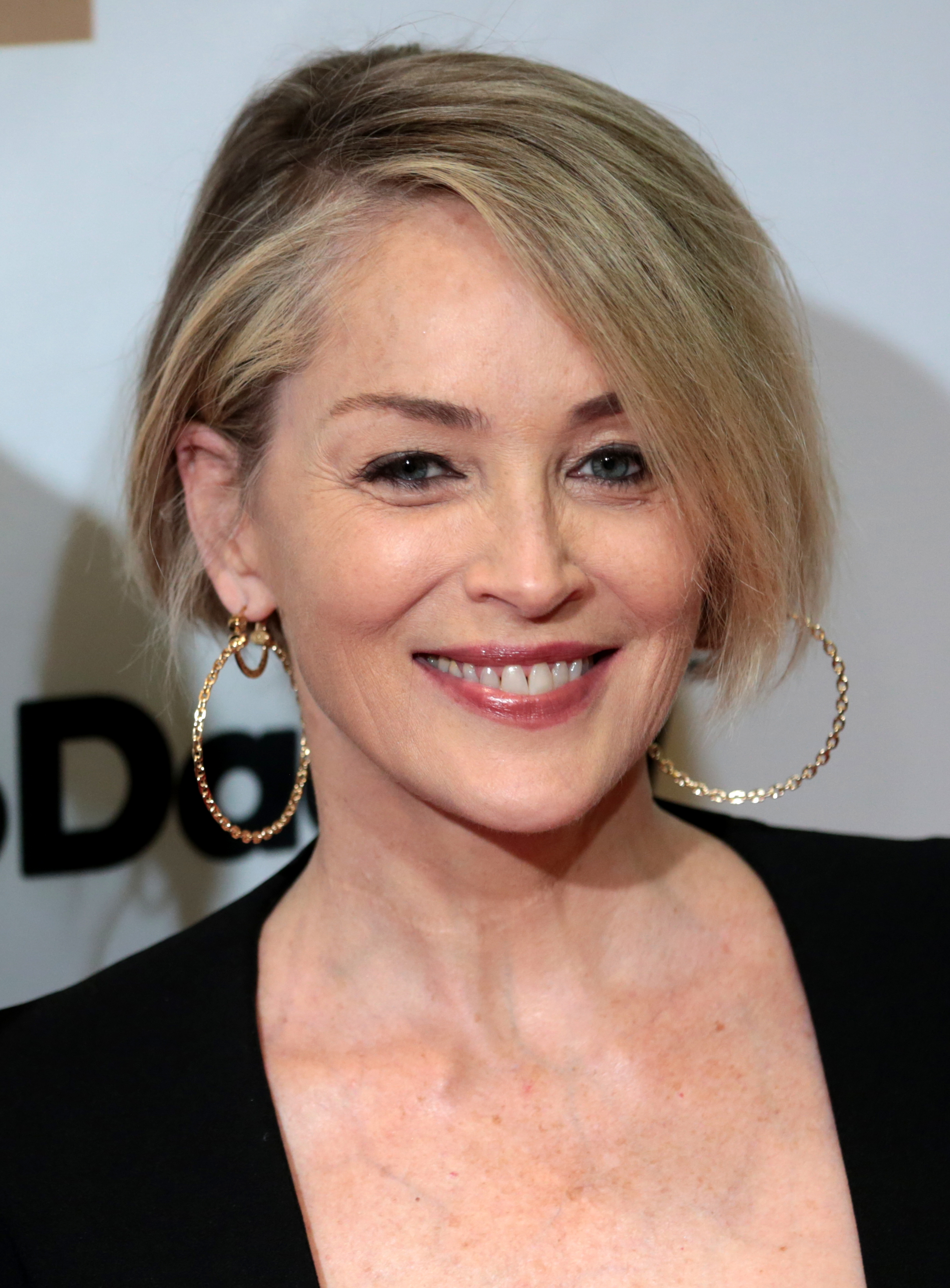
Sharon Stone, Worst Actress winner and Worst Screen Couple co-winner.

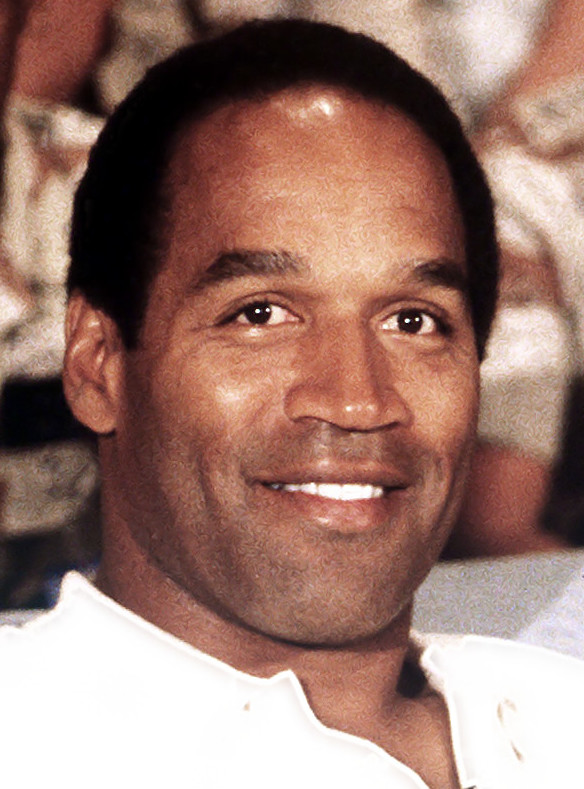
O. J. Simpson, Worst Supporting Actor winner.

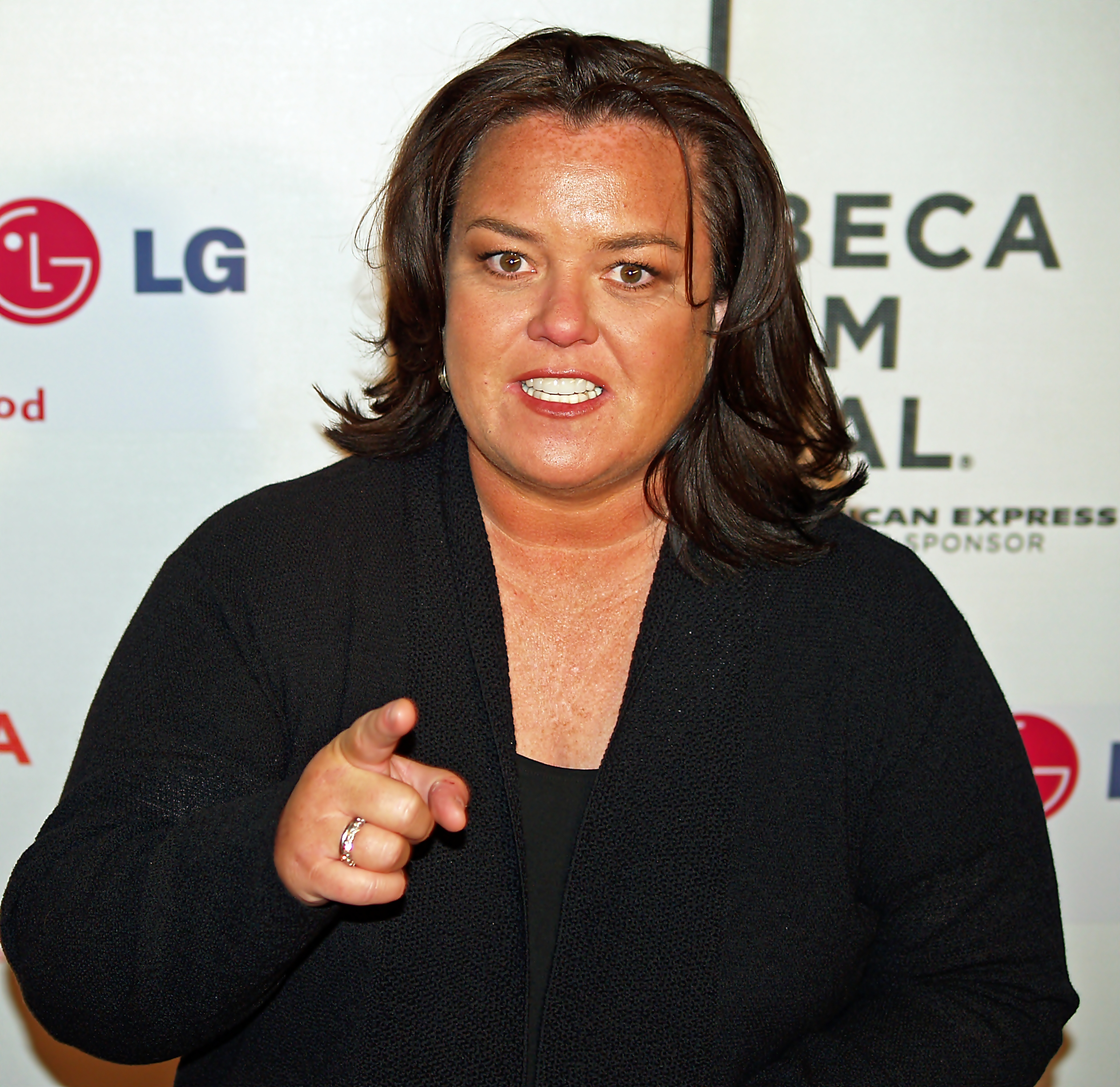
Rosie O'Donnell, Worst Supporting Actress winner.

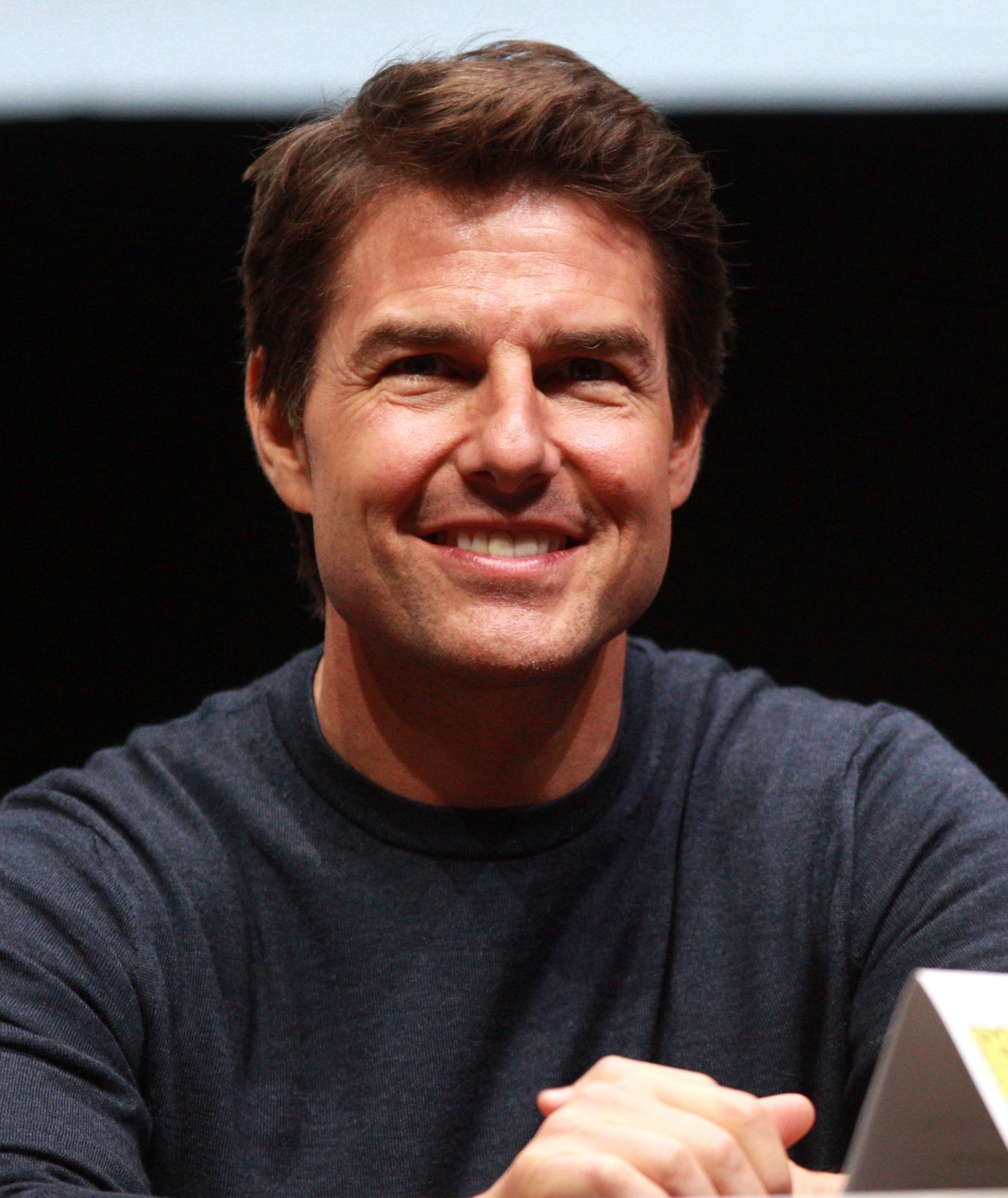
Tom Cruise, Worst Screen Couple co-winner.

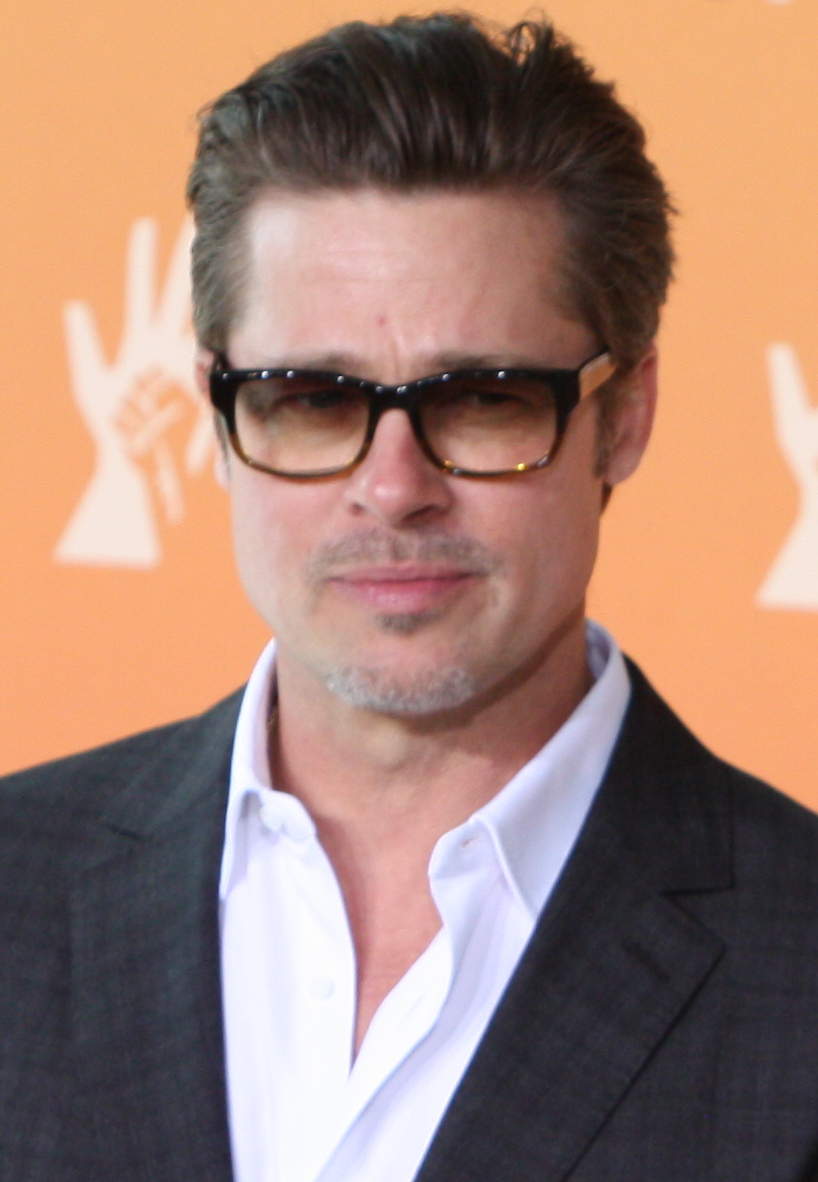
Brad Pitt, Worst Screen Couple co-winner.

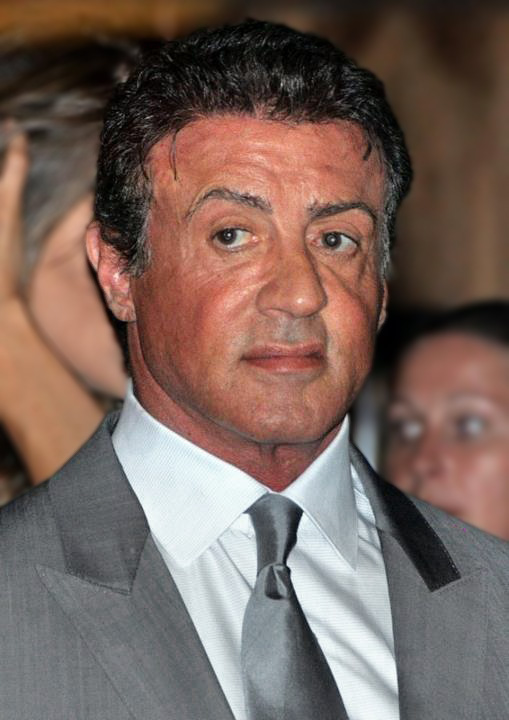
Sylvester Stallone, Worst Screen Couple co-winner.

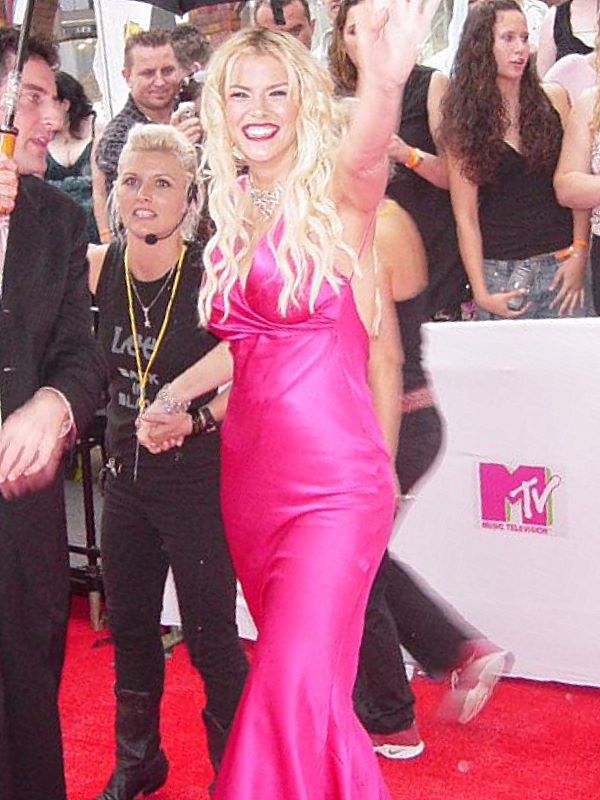
Anna Nicole Smith, Worst New Star winner.

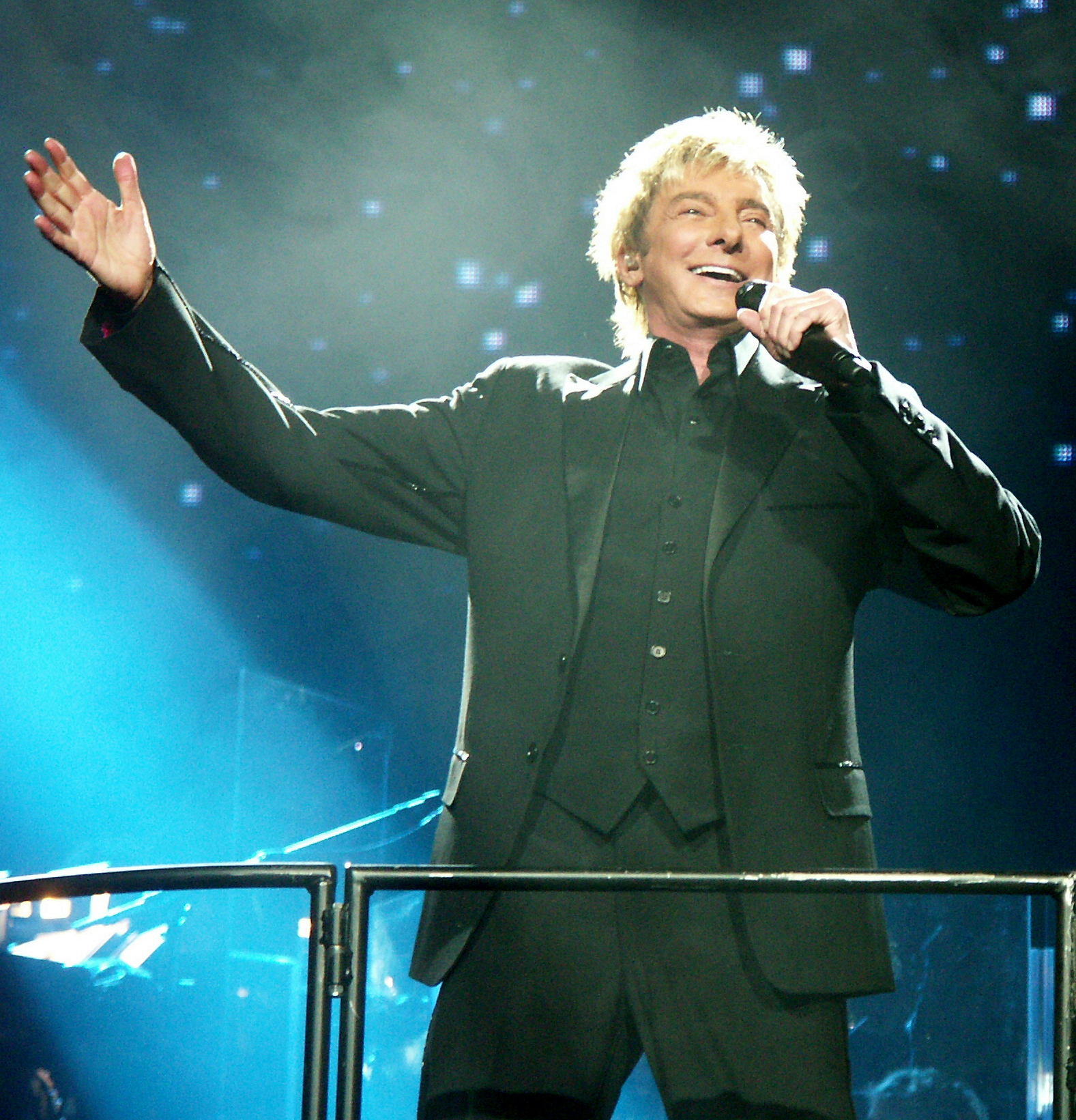
Barry Manilow, Worst Original Song co-winner.

Category	Recipient
Worst Picture	**Color of Night (Hollywood Pictures) - Buzz Feitshans, David Matalon**
Worst Picture	North (Columbia) – Rob Reiner, Alan Zweibel
Worst Picture	On Deadly Ground (Warner Bros.) – Julius R. Nasso, Steven Seagal
Worst Picture	The Specialist (Warner Bros.) – Jerry Weintraub
Worst Picture	Wyatt Earp (Warner Bros.) – Kevin Costner, Lawrence Kasdan, Jim Wilson
Worst Actor	**Kevin Costner in Wyatt Earp as Wyatt Earp**
Worst Actor	Macaulay Culkin in Getting Even with Dad, The Pagemaster and Richie Rich as Timmy Gleason, Richard Tyler and Richie Rich (respectively)
Worst Actor	Steven Seagal in On Deadly Ground as Forrest Taft
Worst Actor	Sylvester Stallone in The Specialist as Ray Quick
Worst Actor	Bruce Willis in Color of Night and North as Dr. Bill Capa and Narrator/Easter Bunny/Gabby/Tourist/Sleigh Driver/Joey Fingers/FedEx Driver (respectively)
Worst Actress	**Sharon Stone in Intersection and The Specialist as Sally Eastman and May Munro (respectively)**
Worst Actress	Kim Basinger in The Getaway as Carol McCoy
Worst Actress	Joan Chen in On Deadly Ground as Masu
Worst Actress	Jane March in Color of Night as Rose
Worst Actress	Uma Thurman in Even Cowgirls Get the Blues as Sissy Hankshaw
Worst Supporting Actor	**O. J. Simpson in Naked Gun 33 1/3: The Final Insult (Simpson was on trial for murder at the time of his "win") as Detective Nordberg**
Worst Supporting Actor	Dan Aykroyd in Exit to Eden and North as Fred Lavery and Pa Tex (respectively)
Worst Supporting Actor	Jane March (as Richie) in Color of Night
Worst Supporting Actor	William Shatner in Star Trek Generations as James T. Kirk
Worst Supporting Actor	Rod Steiger in The Specialist as Joe Leon
Worst Supporting Actress	**Rosie O'Donnell in Car 54, Where Are You?, Exit to Eden and The Flintstones as Lucille Toody, Sheila Kingston and Betty Rubble (respectively)**
Worst Supporting Actress	Kathy Bates in North as Alaskan Mother
Worst Supporting Actress	Elizabeth Taylor in The Flintstones as Pearl Slaghoople
Worst Supporting Actress	Lesley Ann Warren in Color of Night as Sondra Dorio
Worst Supporting Actress	Sean Young in Even Cowgirls Get the Blues as Marie Barth
Worst Screen Couple	**Tom Cruise and Brad Pitt in Interview with the Vampire (tie)**
Worst Screen Couple	**Sylvester Stallone and Sharon Stone in The Specialist (tie)**
Worst Screen Couple	Any combination of two people from the entire cast in Color of Night
Worst Screen Couple	Dan Aykroyd and Rosie O'Donnell in Exit to Eden
Worst Screen Couple	Kevin Costner and "any of his three wives" (Annabeth Gish, Joanna Going, and Mare Winningham) in Wyatt Earp
Worst Director	**Steven Seagal for On Deadly Ground**
Worst Director	Lawrence Kasdan for Wyatt Earp
Worst Director	John Landis for Beverly Hills Cop III
Worst Director	Rob Reiner for North
Worst Director	Richard Rush for Color of Night
Worst Screenplay	**The Flintstones, written by Tom S. Parker, Babaloo Mandel, Mitch Markowitz, Dava Savel, Brian Levant, Michael G. Wilson, Al Aidekman, Cindy Begel, Lloyd Garver, David Silverman, Stephen Sustarsic, Nancy Steen, Neil Thompson, Daniel Goldin, Joshua Goldin, Peter Martin Wortmann, Robert Conte, Jeff Reno, Ron Osborn, Bruce Cohen, Jason Hoffs, Kate Barker, Gary Ross, Rob Dames, Leonard Ripps, Fred Fox Jr., Lon Diamond, David Richardson, Roy Teicher, Richard Gurman, Michael J. Di Gaetano, and Ruth Bennett** (Although Jim Jennewein and Steven E. de Souza were both credited as primary screenwriters, first-billed writer Tom S. Parker was the only "winner" credited in the film; the other 31 recipients all wrote drafts of the screenplay.)
Worst Screenplay	Color of Night, screenplay by Matthew Chapman and Billy Ray, story by Ray
Worst Screenplay	Milk Money, written by John Mattson
Worst Screenplay	North, screenplay by Alan Zweibel and Andrew Sheinman, from the novel by Zweibel
Worst Screenplay	On Deadly Ground, written by Ed Horowitz & Rubin Russin
Worst New Star	**Anna Nicole Smith in Naked Gun 33 1/3: The Final Insult as Tanya Peters**
Worst New Star	Jim Carrey in Ace Ventura: Pet Detective, Dumb and Dumber and The Mask as Ace Ventura, Lloyd Christmas and Stanley Ipkiss/The Mask (respectively)
Worst New Star	Chris Elliott in Cabin Boy as Nathaniel Mayweather
Worst New Star	Chris Isaak in Little Buddha as Dean Conrad
Worst New Star	Shaquille O'Neal in Blue Chips as Neon Boudreaux
Worst Original Song	**"Marry the Mole!" from Thumbelina, music by Barry Manilow, lyrics by Jack Feldman and Bruce Sussman**
Worst Original Song	"The Color of the Night" from Color of Night, music and lyrics by Jud J. Friedman, Lauren Christy and Dominic Frontiere (also nominated for a Golden Globe)
Worst Original Song	"Under the Same Sun" from On Deadly Ground, written by Mark Hudson, Klaus Meine and Scott Fairbairn
Worst Remake or Sequel	**Wyatt Earp (Warner Bros.) – Kevin Costner / Lawrence Kasdan / Jim Wilson**
Worst Remake or Sequel	Beverly Hills Cop III (Paramount) – Robert Rehme / Mace Neufeld
Worst Remake or Sequel	City Slickers II: The Legend of Curly's Gold (Columbia) – Billy Crystal
Worst Remake or Sequel	The Flintstones (Universal) – Bruce Cohen
Worst Remake or Sequel	Love Affair (Warner Bros.) – Warren Beatty

== Films with multiple nominations ==
These films received multiple nominations:

Nominations	Films
9	Color of Night
6	North
6	On Deadly Ground
5	The Specialist
5	Wyatt Earp
4	The Flintstones
3	Exit to Eden
2	Beverly Hills Cop III
2	Even Cowgirls Get the Blues
2	Naked Gun 33 1/3: The Final Insult

== Criticism ==
In later years, the nomination for Jim Carrey in the Worst New Star category has been heavily criticized.

== See also ==
- 1994 in film
- 67th Academy Awards
- 48th British Academy Film Awards
- 52nd Golden Globe Awards
- 1st Screen Actors Guild Awards
