= List of awards and nominations received by Bruce Willis =

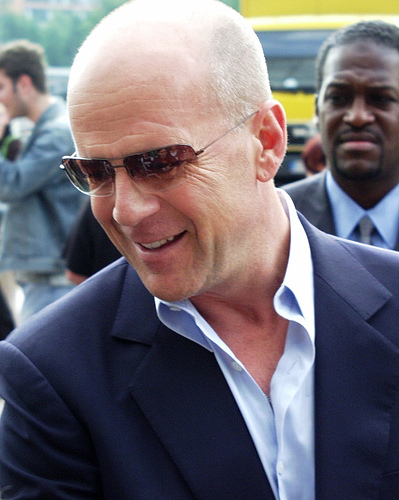
Willis in June 2006

The following is a list of awards and nominations received by American actor, producer and singer Bruce Willis.

== American Comedy Awards ==
Year	Category	Nominated work	Result
1993	Funniest Lead Actor in a Motion Picture	Death Becomes Her	Nominated
2001	Funniest Male Guest Appearance in a Television Series	Friends	Won

== Blockbuster Entertainment Awards ==
Year	Category	Nominated work	Result	Ref.
1996	Favorite Actor — Action/Adventure	Die Hard With A Vengeance	Nominated	
1998	Favorite Actor – Suspense	The Jackal	Nominated	
1999	Favorite Actor – Sci-Fi	Armageddon	Won	
1999	Favorite Supporting Actor – Suspense	The Siege	Won	
2000	Favorite Actor – Suspense	The Sixth Sense	Won	
2001	Favorite Actor – Suspense	Unbreakable	Nominated	

== Boston Society of Film Critics Awards ==
Year	Category	Nominated work	Result
2012	Best Ensemble Cast	Moonrise Kingdom	Nominated

== CableACE Award ==
Year	Category	Nominated work	Result
1988	Writing a Musical Special or Series	The Return of Bruno	Nominated

== Central Ohio Film Critics Association Awards ==
Year	Category	Nominated work	Result
2013	Best Ensemble	Moonrise Kingdom	Won

== Chlotrudis Awards ==
Year	Category	Nominated work	Result
1995	Best Supporting Actor	Pulp Fiction and Nobody's Fool	Nominated

== Critics' Choice Movie Awards ==
Year	Category	Nominated work	Result
2006	Best Acting Ensemble	Sin City	Nominated

== Gold Derby Awards ==
Year	Category	Nominated work	Result
2006	Ensemble Cast	Sin City	Nominated

== Golden Globe Awards ==
Year	Category	Nominated work	Result
1986	Best Actor in a Television Series – Comedy or Musical	Moonlighting	Nominated
1987	Best Actor in a Television Series – Comedy or Musical	Moonlighting	Won
1988	Best Actor in a Television Series – Comedy or Musical	Moonlighting	Nominated
1990	Best Actor in a Television Series – Comedy or Musical	Moonlighting	Nominated
1990	Best Supporting Actor – Motion Picture	In Country	Nominated

== Golden Raspberry Awards ==
Year	Category	Nominated work	Result
1992	Worst Screenplay	Hudson Hawk	Won
1992	Worst Actor	Hudson Hawk	Nominated
1995	Worst Actor	Color of Night and North	Nominated
1999	Worst Actor	Armageddon, Mercury Rising and The Siege	Won
2019	Worst Actor	Death Wish	Nominated
2020	Worst Supporting Actor	Glass	Nominated
2021	Worst Supporting Actor	Breach, Hard Kill and Survive the Night	Nominated
2022	Worst Bruce Willis Performance in a 2021 Movie	American Siege	Rescinded
2022	Worst Bruce Willis Performance in a 2021 Movie	Apex	Rescinded
2022	Worst Bruce Willis Performance in a 2021 Movie	Cosmic Sin	Won (Later Rescinded)
2022	Worst Bruce Willis Performance in a 2021 Movie	Deadlock	Rescinded
2022	Worst Bruce Willis Performance in a 2021 Movie	Fortress	Rescinded
2022	Worst Bruce Willis Performance in a 2021 Movie	Midnight in the Switchgrass	Rescinded
2022	Worst Bruce Willis Performance in a 2021 Movie	Out of Death	Rescinded
2022	Worst Bruce Willis Performance in a 2021 Movie	Survive the Game	Rescinded

== Gotham Awards ==
Year	Category	Nominated work	Result
2012	Best Ensemble Performance	Moonrise Kingdom	Nominated

== Independent Spirit Awards ==
Year	Category	Nominated work	Result
2013	Best Supporting Male	Moonrise Kingdom	Nominated

== MTV Movie & TV Awards ==
Year	Category	Nominated work	Result
1992	Best On-Screen Duo (shared with Damon Wayans)	The Last Boy Scout	Nominated
2000	Best Male Performance	The Sixth Sense	Nominated
2000	Best On-Screen Duo (shared with Haley Joel Osment)	The Sixth Sense	Nominated

== National Movie Awards ==
Year	Category	Nominated work	Result
2007	Best Performance by a Male	Live Free or Die Hard	Nominated

== Nickelodeon Kids' Choice Awards ==
Year	Category	Nominated work	Result
2004	Favorite Voice from an Animated Movie	Rugrats Go Wild	Nominated
2007	Favorite Voice from an Animated Movie	Over the Hedge	Nominated

== Online Film & Television Association Awards ==
Year	Category	Nominated work	Result
1998	Best Sci-Fi/Fantasy/Horror Actor	The Fifth Element	Nominated
2000	Best Guest Actor in a Comedy Series	Friends	Won

== People's Choice Awards ==
Year	Category	Nominated work	Result
1986	Favorite Male Performer in a New Television Program	Moonlighting	Won
1986	Favorite Male Television Performer	Moonlighting	Nominated
1987	Favorite Male Television Performer	Moonlighting	Nominated
2000	Favorite Motion Picture Star in a Drama	The Sixth Sense	Won
2008	Favorite Male Movie Star	Live Free or Die Hard	Nominated
2008	Favorite Male Movie Star	Live Free or Die Hard	Nominated

== Phoenix Film Critics Society Awards ==
Year	Category	Nominated work	Result
2012	Best Ensemble Acting	Moonrise Kingdom	Won

== Primetime Emmy Awards ==
Year	Category	Nominated work	Result
1986	Outstanding Lead Actor in a Drama Series	Moonlighting	Nominated
1987	Outstanding Lead Actor in a Drama Series	Moonlighting	Won
2000	Outstanding Guest Actor in a Comedy Series	Friends	Won

== Saturn Awards ==
Year	Category	Nominated work	Result
1993	Best Actor	Death Becomes Her	Nominated
1996	Best Actor	Twelve Monkeys	Nominated
1999	Best Actor	Armageddon	Nominated
2000	Best Actor	The Sixth Sense	Nominated

== Southeastern Film Critics Association Awards ==
Year	Category	Nominated work	Result
2012	Best Ensemble	Moonrise Kingdom	Nominated

== St. Louis Film Critics Association Awards ==
Year	Category	Nominated work	Result
2012	Best Supporting Actor	Moonrise Kingdom	Nominated

== Stinkers Bad Movie Awards ==
Year	Category	Nominated work	Result
1994	Worst Actor	Color of Night and North	Won
1998	Worst Actor	Armageddon	Won
1999	Worst On-Screen Couple (shared with Michelle Pfeiffer)	The Story of Us	Nominated

== TV Land Awards ==
Year	Category	Nominated work	Result
2005	Favorite Private Eye	Moonlighting	Nominated
2006	Little Screen/Big Screen Star – Men	Moonlighting	Nominated
