= Color of Night =

1994 American erotic thriller film

- Theatrical release poster
- Directed by: Richard Rush
- Screenplay by: Billy Ray; Matthew Chapman
- Story by: Billy Ray
- Produced by: Buzz Feitshans; David Matalon; Andrew G. Vajna
- Starring: Bruce Willis; Jane March; Rubén Blades; Lesley Ann Warren; Brad Dourif; Lance Henriksen; Kevin J. O'Connor; Scott Bakula
- Cinematography: Dietrich Lohmann
- Edited by: Jack Hofstra
- Music by: Dominic Frontiere
- Production companies: Hollywood Pictures; Cinergi Pictures
- Distributed by: Buena Vista Pictures Distribution (North America/South America); Cinergi Productions (International, via Summit Entertainment)
- Release date: August 19, 1994
- Running time: 121 minutes 139 minutes (Director's cut)
- Country: United States
- Language: English
- Budget: $40 million
- Box office: $46.7 million

Color of Night is a 1994 American erotic thriller film produced by Cinergi Pictures and released in the United States by Buena Vista Pictures (through its Hollywood Pictures label). The film was directed by Richard Rush, written by Billy Ray and Matthew Chapman, and stars Bruce Willis, Jane March, Rubén Blades, Lesley Ann Warren, Brad Dourif, Lance Henriksen, Kevin J. O'Connor and Scott Bakula.

Color of Night was a box-office bomb and "won" the Golden Raspberry Award for Worst Picture at the 15th Golden Raspberry Awards, where it received a leading nine nominations. It became one of the 20 most-rented films in the United States home video market in 1995. Maxim magazine also singled Color of Night out as having the best sex scene in film history. It is noted for its style, akin to the Italian giallo genre, and has gone on to achieve cult status.

In 2018, Kino Lorber (under license from Disney) released a special edition Blu-ray of the film that contains an audio commentary by Rush. In 2023, the film was streamed on the Criterion Channel.

== Plot ==
Forty-something New York psychologist Dr. Bill Capa falls into a deep depression after his unstable patient Michelle commits suicide before his eyes by jumping from his office window. The sight of the body clad in a bright green dress lying in a pool of blood causes him to suffer from psychosomatic color blindness, taking away his ability to see the color red. Bill travels to Los Angeles to stay with a friend, fellow therapist and former college colleague Dr. Bob Moore, who invites him to sit in on a group therapy session.

The therapy group includes: Clark, a temperamental attorney with OCD; Sondra Doria, a nymphomaniac and kleptomaniac; Buck, a suicidal former police officer; Casey Heinz, who paints sado-masochistic images; and Richie Dexter, a 16-year old with gender dysphoria and a history of drug use. As Bill spends the next morning with Bob, the latter confides that his house is heavily protected due to anonymous threats, which he believes are connected to the group. He had contacted the police but as therapists are often threatened, they are not taken seriously.

However, Bob is soon after violently murdered in the office and Bill is plunged into the mystery of his friend's death. Lt. Hector Martinez considers everyone in Bob's therapy group, including Bill, as suspects in the murder. Bill continues to live in Bob's house and begins an affair with Rose, a beautiful but mysterious young woman he meets after she rear ends his car one day, who comes and goes. Bill takes over the therapy group, initially upon Martinez's suggestion as a way of assessing the possible suspects.

Dale Dexter comes to the psychology office, trying to convince Bill to release his brother Richie from the group sessions. As social services took over, he is a ward of the state. Dale insists he would be better off without. When Bill looks into the Dexters, they had been thrown into the system four years ago when Richie was 12 and put under the psychological care of Dr. Niedelmeyer but disappeared from their radar until recently.

Bill visits Sondra, so her friend Bonnie ducks out. When he asks her about Richie, she mentions he was molested years ago. Bill asks, due to an isolated attack by him, if Sondra thinks the teen is prone to violence. She whole-heartedly declares Richie could never hurt anyone, naming Clark as a more likely suspect. Clark gets a home visit from Bill and confesses he has slept with Sondra, hence their mutual animosity. Clark's OCD does not allow him to see her much. He mentions he is seeing a small, tidy woman.

Rose spends most of a day with Bill at Bob's. They look through an old album of photos, where there are several photos of the college friends and early photos with their wives at the time. Rose asks to see more recent ones of Bill. He produces one he had found hidden but she quickly changes her mind after seeing a few. As Bill goes to shower, Rose slips photos out, which he catches so she runs out.

After Casey is murdered, Bill becomes the target of several attempts on his life. He discovers that all of his patients except Ritchie have been romantically involved with Bonnie. He eventually learns that both Bonnie and Richie are really Rose and the murders were the work of her deranged brother Dale. They once had an actual brother named Richie, who hanged himself after being molested by his child psychiatrist Dr. Niedelmeyer, who also abused Dale. After Richie committed suicide, Dale abused Rose into playing the part of their brother. Rose began to re-emerge during therapy and, under another personality named Bonnie, started relationships with the other patients. Dale proceeded to kill them, fearing that they would soon link Rose to Richie.

Dale kidnaps Rose and tries to kill Lt. Martinez and Bill with a nail gun when they arrive to rescue her. At the last moment, Rose frees herself and kills Dale with his nail gun, as he is distracted answering Bill's questions. Deeply traumatized, she immediately tries to commit suicide but Bill chases after her and convinces her to keep living. As they kiss, he regains the ability to see the color red.

== Cast ==
- Bruce Willis as Dr. Bill Capa
- Jane March as Rose Dexter / Richie Dexter / Bonnie
- Rubén Blades as Lieutenant Hector Martinez
- Lesley Ann Warren as Sondra Dorio
- Scott Bakula as Dr. Bob Moore
- Brad Dourif as Clark
- Lance Henriksen as Buck
- Kevin J. O'Connor as Casey Heinz
- Andrew Lowery as Dale Dexter
- Eriq La Salle as Officer Anderson
- Jeff Corey as Dr. Larry Ashland
- Kathleen Wilhoite as Michelle
- Shirley Knight as Edith Niedelmeyer

== Music ==
=== Soundtrack ===
The soundtrack to Color of Night as composed by Dominic Frontiere, with songs from Lauren Christy, Jud Friedman, Brian McKnight and Lowen & Navarro, was released on August 9, 1994 by Mercury Records.

Color of Night - From the Original Motion Picture Soundtrack
No.	Title	Performers	Length
1.	"Love Theme"	Dominic Frontiere	4:44
2.	"Color Blind"	Dominic Frontiere	2:10
3.	"Sessions"	Dominic Frontiere	5:22
4.	"Rain"	Lauren Christy	5:27
5.	"The Color of the Night"	Jud Friedman, Lauren Christy, Dominic Frontiere (cantonese: Karen Tong)	3:55
6.	"The Color of the Night (Instrumental Version)"	Brian McKnight	2:59
7.	"Rose's Theme"	Dominic Frontiere	3:33
8.	"Etude for Murder"	Dominic Frontiere	3:33
9.	"The Photograph"	Dominic Frontiere	2:23
10.	"Just to See You"	Lowen & Navarro	3:55
Total length:			34:11

== Release ==
=== Theatrical ===
Richard Rush turned his cut of the film over to producer Andrew Vajna in late 1993. Vajna was concerned about the film's commercial prospects and demanded a recut, something Rush refused. Nonetheless, Vajna mandated he had final cut per contractual obligation and insisted on testing his own version of the film. After both versions were given a number of test screenings, Vajna determined that his cut would be released and fired Rush in April 1994.

This ultimately escalated into a battle between Rush and Vajna that received coverage in the Los Angeles trades. Rush commented that his version tested higher than Vajna's cut; his statements were defended in Variety and by film critic Bill Arnold, who attended a test screening of Rush's version in Seattle, Washington. The Los Angeles Times, meanwhile, defended Vajna, stating that Rush stubbornly refused any input from the studio. The Directors Guild of America attempted to intervene on the matter.

The battle ultimately ended when Rush suffered a near-fatal heart attack and became hospitalized. Months later, after Rush recovered, he compromised with Vajna that the producer's cut would be released theatrically and that the director's cut would see a video release.

Eventually, four versions were released:

- The R-rated theatrical release from the USA
- The international theatrical release
- The R-rated director's cut
- The unrated director's cut

Among them, international theatrical release version also contains numerous scenes that are not included in the unrated director's cut.

== Reception ==
=== Box office ===
The film opened at number 4 at the US box office, grossing $6,610,488 its opening weekend playing at a total of 1,740 theaters. The film grossed only $19,750,470 in the United States and Canada but grossed $27 million internationally for a worldwide total of $46.7 million compared to its $40 million production budget.

=== Critical response ===
Rotten Tomatoes retrospectively reported that 22% of 49 critics gave the film a positive review, with an average rating of 4.4/10. The site's critics consensus reads, "Bruce willie shot aside, the only other things popping out in Color of Night are some ridiculous plot contortions and majorly camp moments." Metacritic assigned the film a weighted average score of 36 out of 100, based on 28 critics, indicating "generally unfavorable" reviews. Audiences polled by CinemaScore gave the film an average grade of "C" on an A+ to F scale.

Referring to the film as "memorably bizarre," Janet Maslin in her August 19, 1994 The New York Times review wrote: "The enthusiastically nutty Color of Night has the single-mindedness of a bad dream and about as much reliance on everyday logic." She also cited the revelation of the murderer, "whose disguise won't fool anyone, anywhere." Roger Ebert of the Chicago Sun-Times wrote: "I was, frankly, stupefied. To call it absurd would be missing the point, since any shred of credibility was obviously the first thing thrown overboard. It's so lurid in its melodrama and so goofy in its plotting that with just a bit more trouble, it could have been a comedy." Luke Y. Thompson of The New Times praised Jane March's performance and wrote: "Minority opinion here, I know, but I found the sex scenes hot and March's performance truly impressive." Brian McKay of eFilmCritic.com stated the film was a "Mediocre L.A. noir thriller made more tolerable by Jane March disrobing frequently." Ken Hanke of the Mountain Xpress (Asheville, North Carolina) wrote the film was "Underrated, but far from great."

The film is listed as one of the 100 most enjoyably bad movies ever made in Golden Raspberry Awards founder John J. B. Wilson's book The Official Razzie Movie Guide (2005).

=== Accolades ===
At the 15th Golden Raspberry Awards, Color of Night received a leading nine nominations and won a single award, the Golden Raspberry Award for Worst Picture. To date it is the only Worst Picture winner to fail to win in any other category. It was also nominated for Worst Director (Richard Rush), Worst Actor (Bruce Willis, also for North), Worst Actress (Jane March), Worst Supporting Actor (also for March), Worst Supporting Actress (Lesley Ann Warren), Worst Screenplay (Billy Ray & Matthew Chapman), Worst Screen Couple/Combo ("Any combination of two people from the entire cast of Color of Night") and Worst Original Song ("The Color of the Night").

At the 1994 Stinkers Bad Movie Awards, Bruce Willis won the award for Worst Actor (again also for North), while Jane March received a nomination for Worst Actress. At the 52nd Golden Globes, Color of Night was nominated for the Golden Globe Award for Best Original Song for its theme song "The Color of the Night", performed by Lauren Christy. Maxim magazine also awarded Color of Night for having the best sex scene in film history; Rush was especially proud of the award and he kept it in his bathroom.

=== Year-end lists ===
- 3rd worst – Desson Howe, The Washington Post
- 3rd worst – Dan Craft, The Pantagraph
- Worst (not ranked) – Bob Ross, The Tampa Tribune
- #4 Worst - Michael Medved, Sneak Previews
