= City Slickers II: The Legend of Curly's Gold =

1994 film by Paul Weiland

- Theatrical release poster by John Alvin
- Directed by: Paul Weiland
- Written by: Billy Crystal; Lowell Ganz; Babaloo Mandel
- Based on: Characters by Lowell Ganz; Babaloo Mandel
- Produced by: Billy Crystal
- Starring: Billy Crystal; Daniel Stern; Jon Lovitz; Jack Palance; Patricia Wettig
- Cinematography: Adrian Biddle
- Edited by: William M. Anderson; Armen Minasian
- Music by: Marc Shaiman
- Production companies: Castle Rock Entertainment; Face Productions
- Distributed by: Columbia Pictures
- Release date: June 10, 1994
- Running time: 116 minutes
- Country: United States
- Language: English
- Budget: $40 million
- Box office: $72 million

City Slickers II: The Legend of Curly's Gold is a 1994 American Western comedy film directed by Paul Weiland. It is the sequel to City Slickers (1991) and stars Billy Crystal, Daniel Stern, Jon Lovitz and Jack Palance. The film was released on June 10, 1994 by Columbia Pictures. Although it was a mild financial success grossing $72 million against a $40 million budget, the film did not reach the popularity of the first, receiving generally negative responses from critics.

== Plot ==
A year after the events of the first film, Mitch Robbins is a much happier and livelier man, having moved out of the city. He is the manager at a radio station, and has employed his best friend, Phil Berquist. However, he is plagued with nightmares about deceased trail boss, Curly Washburn, and believes he may still be alive. On his 40th birthday, Mitch sees a man resembling Curly on the train. Many things have changed; Phil Berquist is single again, plus Mitch's immature younger brother, Glen is plaguing the household with his antics. Mitch later finds a treasure map belonging to Lincoln Washburn hidden in Curly's old cowboy hat, albeit with a missing corner. He and Phil investigate the map's contents and learn that Lincoln was Curly's father and a train robber in the Old West. In 1908, he infamously stole and hid one million dollars in gold bullion in the deserts near Las Vegas. With an impending trip to Las Vegas for a convention, Mitch decides to search for the gold (now worth twenty million) along with Phil and Glen.

Several mishaps ensue, such as Glen accidentally burning a hole in the map with a magnifying glass, Mitch nearly falling off a cliff while retrieving it, and Phil believing a rattlesnake bit him when he sits on a cactus. They are ambushed by Bud and Matt, the two cowboys who sold them their supplies. They demand the map, since Phil recklessly blabbed about the gold. Just as they are poised to kill them, the man resembling Curly appears and fights them off. He introduces himself as Duke, Curly's estranged identical twin brother. He explains that long ago, their father Lincoln had plans to find the gold with his sons once he was no longer being monitored, but he died before he could. On her death bed, their mother gave Curly the map, and he contacted Duke to find him so that they could find the gold together, but he died on the cattle drive the previous year. Duke learned from Cookie that Mitch had Curly's belongings, and so sought him out, though Mitch believed he was Curly. Though Duke is prepared to take the map and find the gold by himself, Mitch chastises him for his attitude, reasoning that Curly would not approve. Out of respect for Curly, Duke relents and allows the others to accompany him and share the gold.

A reckless act by Mitch causes a stampede in which the map and almost all their supplies are lost. Thanks to Glen's memory, they are able to press on and find the location of the cave where the gold is hidden. They eventually find it, but are confronted by two armed bandits, also seeking it. In the ensuing fight, Glen is shot, but Duke discovers the bullets to be blanks with red paint pellets. At that moment, Clay Stone, the organizer of the cattle drive, appears along with some of their old friends, such as Ira and Barry Shalowitz. Clay explains that the two bandits are his sons and he has been looking for Duke for some time. Having left the cattle business, he is now making a living taking men on a trip to find the gold, which is revealed to be lead bars painted gold. Mitch, Phil and Glen are initially depressed, but soon admit that they've enjoyed their adventures, despite having found no gold. Duke remains convinced that the gold is out there somewhere, and stays behind as the others return to Las Vegas.

Mitch is visited by Duke in his hotel room, who confesses that he had planned to cheat Mitch and the others out of the gold, but couldn't bring himself to do so, having found his 'one thing' to be honesty. Through Mitch's skepticism, Duke also reveals that he possesses the missing corner of the map, which points to where Lincoln reburied the gold in 1909, and presents a bar of it to Mitch as evidence. He tries to scratch the gold off with a knife, and screams in joy upon realizing that it is real after all.

== Cast ==
- Billy Crystal as Mitch Robbins
- Daniel Stern as Phil Berquist
- Jon Lovitz as Glen Robbins
- Jack Palance as Duke Washburn
  - Palance also portrays Curly Washburn in a nightmare sequence
  - A publicity image of Palance from the film Shane is used as a photo of Duke and Curly's father, Lincoln Washburn
- Patricia Wettig as Barbara Robbins
- Pruitt Taylor Vince as Bud
- Bill McKinney as Matt
- Lindsay Crystal as Holly Robbins
- Noble Willingham as Clay Stone
- David Paymer as Ira Shalowitz
- Josh Mostel as Barry Shalowitz
- Beth Grant as Lois
- Jayne Meadows as Mrs. Robbins (voice)
- Jennifer Crystal as Jogger
- Bob Balaban as Dr. Jeffrey Sanborn (uncredited)

== Production ==
Parts of the film were shot in Arches National Park, Dugout Ranch, Professor Valley and Goblin Valley in Utah. Bruno Kirby did not return to reprise his role as Ed Furrillo from the original film, partly because he was highly allergic to horses and required constant allergy treatments to do his scenes.

In 2008, director Paul Weiland later spoke of creative differences he had with Billy Crystal, and that Crystal wanted to be director, leading to clashes.

== Home Video ==
Shout Factory (under license from Warner Bros. Home Entertainment) released on May 25, 2021, on Blu-ray disc in Region 1.

== Reception ==
=== Box office ===
City Slickers II: The Legend of Curly's Gold grossed $43 million in the United States and Canada and $72 million worldwide. It came in third place at the US box office, behind Speed and The Flintstones.

=== Critical response ===
City Slickers II: The Legend of Curly's Gold received negative reviews from critics. On Rotten Tomatoes, it has an approval rating of 15% based on 26 reviews. The website's consensus reads: "Lacking any of the charm of its predecessor, City Slickers 2 meanders around the map without ever finding comedy gold." On Metacritic, the film has a score of 43 out of 100 based on reviews from 23 critics. Audiences surveyed by CinemaScore gave the film a grade A− on scale of A to F.

Roger Ebert of the Chicago Sun-Times wrote: "City Slickers II, subtitled The Legend of Curly's Gold, makes the mistake of thinking we care more about the gold than about the city slickers. Like too many sequels, it has forgotten what the first film was really about. Slickers II is about the MacGuffin instead of the characters." On At the Movies, Ebert's colleague Gene Siskel also disliked the film, considering it a pale, unfunny retread of the first film, saying it would have been more interesting to instead bring Duke into the New York City world of the three main characters.

Janet Maslin of The New York Times said that the film "has no real purpose beyond the obvious one of following up a hit, although the original film was just as casual at times. Both of them rely on Billy Crystal's breezy, dependably funny screen presence to hold the interest, even when not much around him is up to par. Both also count on the irascible Jack Palance, even though Mr. Palance's Curly was dead and buried when the first film was over."

Peter Rainer of the Los Angeles Times said that "with several years to ponder a way to honorably recycle City Slickers, the filmmakers responsible for the sequel—director Paul Weiland and scripters Crystal, Lowell Ganz and Babaloo Mandel—have come up with a buried-treasure plot that would barely pass muster as an old Republic Pictures Western. The only things missing are the singing cowboys."

=== Year-end lists ===
- 9th worst – John Hurley, Staten Island Advance
- 10th worst – Desson Howe, The Washington Post
- Top 18 worst (alphabetically listed, not ranked) – Michael Mills, The Palm Beach Post

=== Accolades ===
The film was nominated for a Golden Raspberry Award for Worst Remake or Sequel at the 15th Golden Raspberry Awards and a Stinkers Bad Movie Award for Worst Sequel at the 1994 Stinkers Bad Movie Awards.
