= The Specialist =

1994 film by Luis Llosa

- Theatrical release poster
- Directed by: Luis Llosa
- Written by: Alexandra Seros
- Based on: The Specialist by John Shirley
- Produced by: Jerry Weintraub
- Starring: Sylvester Stallone; Sharon Stone; James Woods; Rod Steiger; Eric Roberts
- Cinematography: Jeffrey L. Kimball
- Edited by: Jack Hofstra
- Music by: John Barry
- Production company: Jerry Weintraub Productions
- Distributed by: Warner Bros.
- Release date: October 7, 1994 (United States)
- Running time: 110 minutes
- Country: United States
- Language: English
- Budget: $45 million
- Box office: $170.4 million

The Specialist is a 1994 American action thriller film directed by Luis Llosa and starring Sylvester Stallone, Sharon Stone, James Woods, Eric Roberts, and Rod Steiger. It is loosely based on The Specialist series of novels by John Shirley. The film was met with negative critical response, but became a box office success, and Gloria Estefan's version of "Turn the Beat Around" became a dance sensation, becoming #1 on Billboard’s Dance Club Songs chart.

== Plot ==
In 1984, Captain Ray Quick and Colonel Ned Trent, explosives experts working for the CIA, are on a mission to blow up a car transporting a South American cocaine dealer. However, when the car appears, a little girl is inside with the dealer. Ray insists they abort the mission, but Ned intends to see it through and detonates the bomb, killing the occupants. Furious, Ray beats Ned, reports him to his superiors, and resigns from the CIA.

Years later, in Miami, Ray works as a freelance hit man. He responds to ads placed by a woman named May Munro and speaks with her often to decide whether to take the job. She is the only child of parents who were killed by Tomas Leon and his men. Against his better judgment, and pushed by her insistence that she will infiltrate the gang with or without him, Ray is persuaded to accept the job. Even though he has agreed, May ingratiates herself into Tomas's world as Adrian Hastings.

Ned now works for Joe Leon, Tomas's father and director of their organized crime syndicate. Once the hits on their lower-level men begin, they contact the chief of police to place Ned in their bomb squad. May tolerates Tomas and plays along as his girlfriend, watching the hits one by one personally. It is revealed that May has been forced into a partnership with Ned, who aims to coax Ray out of hiding. After the assignment in South America backfired, Ned was dismissed from the CIA and is intent on revenge.

When a trap for Tomas is set, May is in the room; the resulting explosion appears to kill them both. Ned goes to Joe to pay his respects; the grieving father lets Ned live only so that he can find Ray and take him alive before Tomas is buried. Ray and Ned believe May is dead, yet Ray discovers bulletin board messages are still being posted. He responds to one, realizing that it is a trap set by Ned and the bomb squad, and baits Ned into an explosive tirade.

At Adrian Hastings' funeral, Ray discovers that May is alive. She went there to see whether Ray would attend. The two go to the Fontainebleau Hotel and have sex. She then leaves. Meanwhile, Ned has gone to the cathedral and learns that the person in the casket is not May. She runs into Ned in the hotel lobby and makes an excuse as to why she did not reveal that she was alive. A henchman is ordered to take her to the car, and en route, she asks to use the restroom. Once there, she calls to warn Ray. He rigs the hotel room to explode. When Ned's henchmen appear, it detonates, killing three of them.

May is taken to Joe Leon, but Ned insists on keeping her alive to lure Ray out. Ned listens in as Ray calls May; he refuses to meet her and be "set up" again, but she convinces him she truly cares about him. He arranges a meeting at a seafood restaurant, and May uses secret coding to tell him it is a trap before hanging up. When Ned sends May inside, the restaurant explodes. Ray and May escape to his warehouse. Ned listens to the recording of Ray's call and tracks down his location. The next morning, May is preparing to leave to kill Joe Leon herself, but Ray tells her to let go of the past. Ned arrives with an army of police that surrounds the booby-trapped warehouse. Ray and May are cornered. While pursuing them, Ned steps on a mine. The warehouse explodes, killing Ned; Ray and May escape unseen through a tunnel. The next day, Joe opens his mail and finds a necklace. It contains a picture of May's parents and is rigged with a bomb, which kills Joe instantly. After hearing the necklace explode and knowing all those responsible for her parents' death are dead, Ray asks how May feels, to which she responds, "Better". They drive off to start their life together.

== Cast ==
- Sylvester Stallone as Captain Raymond Ray "The Specialist" Quick
- Sharon Stone as May Munro / Adrian Hastings
  - Brittany Paige Bouck as Young May Munro
- James Woods as Colonel Ned Trent
- Eric Roberts as Tomas Leon
- Rod Steiger as Joe Leon
- Mario Ernesto Sánchez as Charlie
- Sergio Doré Jr. as Bill, The Strong Arm
- Chase Randolph as Stan Munro
- Jeana Bell as Alice Munro

Gloria Estefan's husband, Emilio Estefan Jr., has a small part as the piano player; recording artist LaGaylia Frazier appears as a singer; and character actor Brent Sexton plays Manny.

== Production ==
Alexandra Seros had written the script back in the 1980s, being inspired by The Specialist series of books by John Cutter, and the films The Conversation and Last Tango in Paris; the script made the rounds until it was optioned and bought by Warner Bros. Pictures.

Around 1991, Mario Van Peebles was attached to direct the film, but he left.

At one stage, David Fincher was set to direct the film, as Stallone liked Fincher's work, but he was overruled, owing to the box office failure of Alien 3, which Fincher had directed.

The Hughes brothers turned down an offer to direct the film.

In January 1993, the Los Angeles Times listed The Specialist as the best unproduced thriller script in Hollywood, based on a poll of forty agents, producers and studio executives.

Steven Seagal was offered to star in and direct the film. Seagal was a fan of the script, but he wanted the sex scenes toned down, and wanted $9 million. The studio did not want to pay Seagal that much money, and offered it to Sylvester Stallone instead.

In his autobiography, Roger Moore stated that he was offered a part in the film, but turned it down; he further stated in the book that once he saw the finished product, he was "glad" he had not taken the part.

Once the film went into production, numerous changes were made to the screenplay, with Akiva Goldsman reworking the script. Stallone's character was originally written as a lonely and existential character. According to Seros, Stallone was interested in doing that, but at the last minute reverted to the action character, and Stone's character was made more of a victim rather than a free agent just lacking identity.

== Reception ==
=== Box office ===
The Specialist opened in the U.S. on October 7 and grossed $14,317,765 in its opening weekend finishing number one at the US box office. In its second weekend, it grossed $8,972,766, finishing second to the claimed $9.3 million gross of Pulp Fiction; however, others disputed Miramax Films' claimed gross and felt that The Specialist was the highest-grossing for the weekend. The film ended up making back its budget with $57,362,582 at the domestic box office while making $113,000,000 internationally, giving it a worldwide gross of $170,362,582. It set a Warner Bros. record opening in the Philippines with $1.1 million and had the fifth biggest opening of all time in Spain with a gross of $2.1 million. It was Stallone's third highest-grossing movie at the box office in the 1990s and the second highest overall gross next to Cliffhanger.

Audiences polled by CinemaScore gave the film an average grade of "B−" on an A+ to F scale.

=== Critical response ===
On Rotten Tomatoes, the film has an approval rating of 10% based on reviews from 31 critics.

Roger Ebert gave it two stars out of four, stating that "The Specialist is one of those films that forces the characters through torturous mazes of dialogue and action, to explain a plot that is so unlikely it's not worth the effort. You know a movie's in trouble when the people in line at the parking garage afterward are trying to figure out what the heroine's motivations were." James Berardinelli rated it one and a half out of four stars, writing "This movie is excruciatingly dumb. And, given the releases of Speed and Blown Away this summer, there's no dearth of explosion-based motion pictures. The only twist this one offers is that here, the bomber is the good guy (...)."

In the 1996 movie guide "Seen That, Now What?", the film was given the rating of "D+", being described, "Strange, would-be erotic thriller/action film is almost torridly bad enough to achieve camp status, with a good supporting cast floundering amidst the explosions and dumb plot."

The film is listed in Golden Raspberry Award founder John Wilson's book The Official Razzie Movie Guide as one of "The 100 Most Enjoyably Bad Movies Ever Made".

=== Accolades ===
At the 15th Golden Raspberry Awards, the film was nominated in five categories and won two of them.

- Worst Picture – Nominated
- Worst Actor (Sylvester Stallone) – Nominated
- Worst Actress (Sharon Stone, also for Intersection) – Winner
- Worst Supporting Actor (Rod Steiger) – Nominated
- Worst Screen Couple (Stallone and Stone) – Winner (tied with Tom Cruise and Brad Pitt for Interview with the Vampire)

At the 17th Stinkers Bad Movie Awards, the film was nominated in four categories and won one of them.

- Worst Picture – Nominated
- Worst Actor (Sylvester Stallone) – Nominated
- Worst Actor (Rod Steiger) – Nominated
- Worst Actress (Sharon Stone, also for Intersection) – Winner

=== Year-end lists ===
- 3rd worst – Sean P. Means, The Salt Lake Tribune
- 4th worst – Janet Maslin, The New York Times
- Top 4 worst (not ranked) – Stephen Hunter, The Baltimore Sun
- Top 10 worst (not ranked) – Dan Webster, The Spokesman-Review
- Top 12 worst (Alphabetically ordered, not ranked) – David Elliott, The San Diego Union-Tribune
- Dishonorable mention – William Arnold, Seattle Post-Intelligencer
- Dishonorable mention – Dan Craft, The Pantagraph
- Worst (not ranked) – Bob Ross, The Tampa Tribune
- #5 Worst - Jeffrey Lyons, Sneak Previews
