= North (1994 film) =

1994 American comedy drama adventure film

- Theatrical release poster by John Alvin
- Directed by: Rob Reiner
- Screenplay by: Alan Zweibel; Andrew Scheinman
- Based on: North: The Tale of a 9‑Year‑Old Boy Who Becomes a Free Agent and Travels the World in Search of the Perfect Parents; 1984 novel by Alan Zweibel
- Produced by: Rob Reiner; Alan Zweibel
- Starring: Elijah Wood; Jon Lovitz; Jason Alexander; Alan Arkin; Dan Aykroyd; Kathy Bates; Faith Ford; Graham Greene; Julia Louis-Dreyfus; Reba McEntire; John Ritter; Abe Vigoda; Bruce Willis
- Cinematography: Adam Greenberg
- Edited by: Robert Leighton
- Music by: Marc Shaiman
- Production companies: Castle Rock Entertainment; New Line Cinema
- Distributed by: Columbia Pictures
- Release date: July 22, 1994
- Running time: 87 minutes
- Country: United States
- Language: English
- Budget: $40–50 million
- Box office: $12 million

North is a 1994 American adventure comedy-drama film directed by Rob Reiner. The story is based on the 1984 novel North: The Tale of a 9-Year-Old Boy Who Becomes a Free Agent and Travels the World in Search of the Perfect Parents by Alan Zweibel, who co-wrote the screenplay and has a minor role in the film.

The cast includes Elijah Wood in the title role, with Jon Lovitz, Jason Alexander, Alan Arkin, Dan Aykroyd, Kathy Bates, Faith Ford, Graham Greene, Julia Louis-Dreyfus, Reba McEntire, John Ritter, and Abe Vigoda. Bruce Willis narrates and plays several different roles throughout the film, and a 9-year-old Scarlett Johansson appears briefly in her film debut. This was the final theatrical film for Alexander Godunov before his death the following year.

The film was shot in Hawaii, Alaska, California, South Dakota, New Jersey, and New York. It was produced by Castle Rock Entertainment and New Line Cinema and released by Columbia Pictures on July 22, 1994. North was a box office bomb, grossing $12 million against its $40 million budget. North was panned by critics, and has been referred to as one of the worst films ever made.

== Plot ==
Skilled in academics, sports, and drama, and praised for his good work and obedience, 11-year-old North feels unvalued by his own parents. The Easter Bunny—a man in a pink bunny suit at a shopping mall—recommends North simply explain his feelings to them, but North says their neglect makes them undeserving. Helped by his best friend Winchell, who works on the school paper, North plots to "divorce" his parents, hiring ambulance-chasing lawyer Arthur Belt to file the papers. The announcement shocks his parents, leaving them unresponsive when Judge Buckle grants his petition, giving him one summer to find new parents or go to an orphanage.

North's first stop is Texas, where his parental candidates, Ma and Pa Tex, promise to use their wealth to fulfill North's desires. In a musical number (set to the Bonanza theme), they explain that their first son, Buck, died in a stampede and they plan to use North to replace Buck, planning out his entire life in advance, including his future wife. They also feed him massive quantities of food hoping he will become as obese as Buck was. Gabby, a sharpshooting cowboy (also the man in the Easter Bunny suit), presents North with a souvenir from his act—a silver dollar with a bullet hole shot through its center—and explains that North is unhappy with the Texes because he wishes to be appreciated for who he is, not made into someone else.

In Hawaii, Governor and Mrs. Ho are struggling with infertility and are eager to adopt. Believing North's presence will attract mainlanders, the governor unveils a tourism campaign referencing the classic Coppertone ad and showcasing North's bare buttocks. The man in the bunny suit reappears on the beach in the guise of a tourist with a metal detector and explains that parents shouldn't use children for personal gain. In an Inuit village in Alaska, two more prospective parents calmly send their elderly grandfather out to sea on an ice floe to die with dignity. North realizes winter is approaching and his summer is almost up.

Back home, North's catatonic parents are put in a museum display. His quest has inspired children worldwide to hire Arthur and Winchell to facilitate leaving their own parents. North's next prospects are Amish, but the lack of conveniences quickly disappoints him. His experiences in Zaire, China, and Paris are equally fruitless. Finally, he finds the Nelsons, an ideal family who give him attention and appreciation, but he is still unsatisfied.

In despair, North escapes to New York City, where Winchell and Arthur, now rich and powerful, fear their lucrative business will fail and plot to assassinate him. On the run, he receives a videotape from his newly revived parents begging for his forgiveness and his return home. The bunny-suit man appears as standup comedian Joey Fingers to encourage him. North is mobbed at the airport by kids who followed his example, angry about his returning to his parents. To escape he ships himself home in a FedEx box. Recognizing the delivery driver from his other appearances, North asks if he is his guardian angel. The man denies meeting North, but as a FedEx representative, he resembles a guardian of important items.

North is delivered to his house prior to the deadline, but as he runs toward his parents, Winchell's assassin Al takes aim. As he squeezes the trigger, North awakens in the now-empty mall. The Easter Bunny takes him home, where his parents, who have been worried during his absence, greet him warmly. It has all been a dream, but in his pocket, North discovers Gabby's silver dollar. North says he has always had it, "for good luck", and goes inside as his parents agree to bring him dinner in bed.

== Cast ==
- Elijah Wood as North
- Jon Lovitz as Arthur Belt
- Bruce Willis as Narrator and benevolent advisors (Easter Bunny, Gabby, Tourist, Sleigh Driver, Joey Fingers, FedEx Driver)
- Jason Alexander as North's Father
- Alan Arkin as Judge Buckle
- Dan Aykroyd as Pa Tex
- Kathy Bates as Alaskan Mother
- Robert Costanzo as Al
- Faith Ford as Donna Nelson
- Graham Greene as Alaskan Father
- Julia Louis-Dreyfus as North's Mother
- Matthew McCurley as Winchell
- Reba McEntire as Ma Tex
- John Ritter as Ward Nelson
- Lauren Tom as Mrs. Ho
- Abe Vigoda as Alaskan Grandfather
- Keone Young as Governor Ho
- Alexander Godunov as Amish Father
- Kelly McGillis as Amish Mother
- Scarlett Johansson as Laura Nelson
- Jesse Ziegler as Bud Nelson
- Ben Stein as Museum Curator
- Taylor Fry as Zoe
- Alana Austin as Hannah
- Jussie Smollett as Adam
- Carmit Bachar as Cowgirl
- Rosalind Chao as Chinese Mother
- Alan Rachins as Defense Attorney
- Richard Belzer as Barker
- Marc Shaiman as Piano Player
- Wendle Josepher as Ticket Agent
- Alan Zweibel as Baseball Coach

== Production ==
Ryan Merriman stated in a 1999 interview alongside Bobbie Wygant that he auditioned for the lead role before Elijah Wood was cast in 1993. The movie was shot in New York with additional shooting in Los Angeles, Hawaii, and Alaska (Prince William Sound and several glaciers). John Candy was initially cast as Pa Tex before dropping out and being replaced by Dan Aykroyd.

== Release ==
=== Home media ===
The initial VHS release of the film came out in 1995 by Columbia TriStar Home Video (under the New Line Home Video label) and the initial LaserDisc release of the film also came out in 1995 by Image Entertainment (under the New Line Home Video label). The film would be out of print for over a decade until Sony Pictures Home Entertainment released a DVD-R containing the film on September 4, 2012, and a BD-R containing the film on August 1, 2017.

== Reception ==
=== Box office ===
The film grossed only $7 million in the United States and Canada and $12.2 million worldwide, making it one of the worst-performing films of the year given its large budget.

=== Critical response ===
North has been called one of the worst films ever made. On the review aggregator website Rotten Tomatoes, 12% of 110 critics' reviews are positive. The website's consensus reads: "Laden with schmaltz and largely bereft of evident narrative purpose, North represents an early major disappointment from previously sure-handed director Rob Reiner." Audiences surveyed by CinemaScore gave the film a grade "B−" on scale of A to F.

Kenneth Turan stated in his review, "The problem overall is not so much that the humor, especially in the parent-tryout situations, is forced, but that it simply is not there at all. So little is going on in this mildest of fantasies that it is hard to even guess what kinds of emotional effects were aimed at in the first place." Turan wrote, "How could director Rob Reiner, whose touch for what pleases a mass audience is usually unfailing, have strayed this far?" Leonard Klady of Variety thought the film was a "noble misfire" that "fails to find the balance or tone that would make the parable work." He described it as a "unique breed of misconceived entertainment that only a filmmaker of talent is capable of making." Joe Brown of The Washington Post called the film "a gentle, harmless and rather pedestrian fantasy" that "seldom raises more than a chuckle." Stephen Hunter of The Baltimore Sun wrote that the film had "no characters, only cutouts", describing it as just "there, dim and witless, occasionally rancidly racist." Janet Maslin of The New York Times was somewhat more positive, writing that the film "doesn't always work, but much of it is clever in amusingly unpredictable ways."

North was a multiple nominee at the 15th Golden Raspberry Awards in six categories including Worst Picture and Worst Director for Rob Reiner.

In an interview with Archive of American Television, Reiner defended the film, saying:

I loved doing it, and some of the best jokes I ever had in a movie, are in that movie. I made this little fable, and people got mad at me, because, you know, I had done When Harry Met Sally..., and Misery, and A Few Good Men, and everybody said 'Oh, it should be a more important kind of movie.' I said, 'Why? Why can't you just make a little slice of a fable or something?'

==== Siskel & Ebert's reviews ====
"I hated this movie. Hated hated hated hated hated this movie. Hated it. Hated every simpering stupid vacant audience-insulting moment of it. Hated the sensibility that thought anyone would like it. Hated the implied insult to the audience by its belief that anyone would be entertained by it."

— Roger Ebert's review of North.

Film critic Roger Ebert of The Chicago Sun-Times seemed especially baffled by North, describing Reiner as "a gifted filmmaker" and Wood as "a talented young actor", but deeming North "one of the worst movies ever made." Ebert stressed that he "hated this movie" and also suggested the film was so poorly written that even the best child actor would look bad in it, and viewed it as "some sort of lapse" on Reiner's part. Ebert awarded North a rare zero-star rating. An abridged version of the remark quoted above became the title of a 2000 book by Ebert, I Hated, Hated, Hated This Movie, a compilation of reviews of films most disliked by Ebert.

Comedian Richard Belzer, who appeared in North, goaded Reiner into reading part of the review aloud at Reiner's roast; after doing so, Reiner joked, "If you read between the lines, it's not that bad."

Writer Alan Zweibel acknowledged that the film had "a veritable avalanche" of negative reviews. He said Ebert's review was "embarrassing" and "hurtful", writing that it was often quoted to him, his wife, and his son (who had inspired the book North). Zweibel described Ebert as "a terrific writer, so maybe that was also part of the reason why it bothered me so much." In an encounter with Ebert years later, Zweibel jokingly said "And I just have to tell you, Roger, that that sweater you're wearing? I hate, hate, hate, hate, hate that sweater." He also keeps a clipping of it in his wallet, which he reads at public events.

Ebert and his co-host on Siskel and Ebert, Gene Siskel, both pronounced it the worst film of 1994, an opinion they each came to independently. In their original review, Ebert called it "one of the most thoroughly hateful movies in recent years. A movie that makes me cringe even when I'm sitting here thinking about it." He later added, "I hated this movie as much as any movie we have ever reviewed in the 19 years we've been doing this show. I hated it because of the premise, which seems shockingly cold-hearted, and because this premise is being suggested to kids as children's entertainment, and because everybody in the movie was vulgar and stupid, and because the jokes weren't funny, and because most of the characters were obnoxious, and because of the phony attempt to add a little pseudo-hip philosophy with the Bruce Willis character." Siskel added, "I think you gotta hold Rob Reiner's feet to the fire here. I mean, he's the guy in charge...he's saying this is entertainment...it's deplorable. There isn't a gag that works. You couldn't write worse jokes if I told you to write worse jokes. The ethnic stereotyping is appalling...it's embarrassing...you feel unclean as you're sitting there. It's junk. First-class junk!" and finished his statement with "Any subject could be done well; this is just trash, Roger." Ebert's future co-host on Ebert and Roeper, Richard Roeper, would later go on to list North as one of the 40 worst movies he's ever seen, stating: "Of all the films on this list, North may be the most difficult to watch from start to finish. I've tried twice and failed. Do yourself a favor and don't even bother. Life is too short."

=== Year-end lists ===
- #1 Worst – Roger Ebert, Chicago Sun-Times
- #1 Worst – Gene Siskel, Chicago Tribune
- #5 Worst – Michael Medved, Sneak Previews
- Top 10 worst (alphabetical order, not ranked) – William Arnold, Seattle Post-Intelligencer
- Top 10 worst (not ranked) – Betsy Pickle, Knoxville News-Sentinel
- Dishonorable mention – Glenn Lovell, San Jose Mercury News
- Dishonorable mention – Dan Craft, The Pantagraph
- Worst (not ranked) – Bob Ross, The Tampa Tribune

=== Accolades ===
Year	Award	Category	Recipients	Result	Ref.
1995	Stinkers Bad Movie Awards	Worst Picture	North (Columbia)	Won	
1995	Stinkers Bad Movie Awards	Worst Actor	Bruce Willis	Won	
March 19, 1995	Young Artist Awards	Best Performance by a Youth Actor Starring in a Motion Picture	Elijah Wood	Nominated	
March 19, 1995	Young Artist Awards	Best Performance by a Young Actor Co-Starring in a Motion Picture	Matthew McCurley	Won	
March 26, 1995	Golden Raspberry Awards	Worst Picture	North (Columbia)	Nominated	
March 26, 1995	Golden Raspberry Awards	Worst Actor	Bruce Willis	Nominated	
March 26, 1995	Golden Raspberry Awards	Worst Supporting Actor	Dan Aykroyd	Nominated	
March 26, 1995	Golden Raspberry Awards	Worst Supporting Actress	Kathy Bates	Nominated	
March 26, 1995	Golden Raspberry Awards	Worst Director	Rob Reiner	Nominated	
March 26, 1995	Golden Raspberry Awards	Worst Screenplay	Alan Zweibel and Andrew Sheinman	Nominated	
June 26, 1995	Saturn Awards	Best Performance by a Younger Actor	Elijah Wood	Nominated	

== See also ==
- List of Easter films
- List of 20th century films considered the worst

Awards
Preceded by Sliver	Stinker Award for Worst Picture; 1994 Stinkers Bad Movie Awards	Succeeded by Showgirls
