= Intersection (1994 film) =

- Directed by: Mark Rydell
- Written by: David Rayfiel; Marshall Brickman
- Produced by: Mark Rydell; Bud Yorkin
- Starring: Richard Gere; Sharon Stone; Lolita Davidovich; Martin Landau
- Cinematography: Vilmos Zsigmond
- Edited by: Mark Warner
- Music by: James Newton Howard
- Distributed by: Paramount Pictures
- Release date: January 21, 1994
- Running time: 98 minutes
- Country: United States
- Language: English
- Budget: $45 million
- Box office: $61.3 million

Intersection is a 1994 romantic drama film, directed by Mark Rydell and starring Richard Gere, Sharon Stone, Lolita Davidovich and Martin Landau. It is a remake of the French film Les choses de la vie (1970) by Claude Sautet. The story — both filmed and set in Vancouver, British Columbia — concerns an architect (played by Gere) who, as his classic Mercedes 280SL roadster hurtles into a collision at an intersection, flashes through key moments in his life, including his marriage to a beautiful but chilly heiress (Stone) and his subsequent affair with a travel writer (Davidovich).

== Plot ==
Vincent Eastman and his wife, Sally, run an architectural firm together. He is the architect and creative director while Sally handles the firm's business end. Unhappy in his marriage to Sally, with whom he has a daughter, Vincent considers his relationship more of a business than a family.

Vincent encounters a journalist, Olivia Marshak at an antique auction and a romantic spark ignites between them. They begin seeing each other whenever possible. After a quarrel with Sally at home, Vincent moves out but is still torn between his marriage and the possibility of a future with Olivia.

At first, deciding that the best course of action for everyone is for him to remain in his unhappy marriage, Vincent writes a letter to Olivia explaining that he is going back to his wife. Before he can mail it, he stops at a convenience store in the country and sees a little girl who reminds him of Olivia. Realizing his true feelings for Olivia, Vincent calls her and leaves a message on her answering machine, telling Olivia that he loves her, wants to start a life with her and that he's certain about his choice.

While speeding back to the city to be with Olivia, Vincent is in a car accident which results in his death. At the hospital, Sally receives Vincent's belongings and finds the letter to Olivia. When Olivia shows up at the hospital, Sally does not tell Olivia about the letter; in turn, Olivia does not tell Sally about the message that Vincent left for her.

The women part ways, each believing that she was Vincent's true love.

== Cast ==
- Richard Gere as Vincent Eastman
- Sharon Stone as Sally Eastman
- Lolita Davidovich as Olivia Marshak
- Martin Landau as Neal
- David Selby as Richard Quarry
- Jennifer Morrison as Meaghan Eastman (as Jenny Morrison)
- Veena Sood as Intern

== Reception ==
Intersection was due for release in late 1993 but due to poor test screening results, the release was delayed until January 1994.

The film received poor reviews from critics with Rotten Tomatoes scoring this film a 9% based on 32 reviews. Roger Ebert described the film as "a belated reminder of one of the unmourned genres of earlier years, the Shaggy Lover Story, in which a doomed romance is told against a backdrop of impending heartbreak. The twist at the end is supposed to send you out of the theater blowing your nose but the people around me seemed more concerned with clearing their sinuses." Kenneth Turan in the Los Angeles Times wrote that the film, "as directed by Mark Rydell[,] is riddled with miscalculations. It’s miscast, filled with characters who are incapable of eliciting sympathy and relates a story so unsatisfying one can only wonder that it got made at all." Janet Maslin of The New York Times said that "as a soap opera elevated by its stellar cast and given the illusion of contemplativeness by repeated slow-motion shots of a car crash, Intersection really ought to be more fun. But despite the glossiness, it winds up seeming profoundly uneventful, perhaps because the car crash is the story's only real dramatic turn. The film's uncredited fourth star, the scenery of Vancouver, adds visual appeal without raising the energy level, although Harold Michelson's lavish production design will hold an audience's interest."

The movie opened to mixed reviews in Vancouver. Peter Birnie of the Vancouver Sun wrote that the film "is all Canadian – and the best evocation of Vancouver ever seen on screen" but decried its numerous cliches and "confusing flashback-within-flashback format that's one hard act to follow." More critical of the film was Lee Bacchus of sister newspaper The Province, who wrote that "director Mark Rydell doesn't seem to know how to kickstart this intriguing yet ultimately boring drama into overdrive. It looks good but doesn't have any spark. It coasts on some solid, subtle and mature work from Gere and company but spins its wheels in its own bland bog of inertia. The car crash – an elegant slow-motion symphony of impending doom – provides the opening frames of Intersection but stops short of actual impact. So does the movie."

Audiences surveyed by CinemaScore gave the film a grade "C+" on scale of A to F. It also won Sharon Stone a Golden Raspberry Award and a Stinker award for Worst Actress for her performance in the film (also for The Specialist).

=== Box office ===
The film opened at number 3 at the US box office on its opening weekend behind Mrs. Doubtfire and Philadelphia, and went on to gross $21.3 million in the US and Canada. It grossed $40 million overseas for a worldwide gross of $61.3 million against a $45 million budget.

=== Year-end lists ===
- 9th worst – Dan Craft, The Pantagraph
- Top 10 worst (not ranked) – Dan Webster, The Spokesman-Review
- Dishonorable mention – Glenn Lovell, San Jose Mercury News
- Worst (not ranked) – Bob Ross, The Tampa Tribune
