= Bruce Willis =

American actor (born 1955)

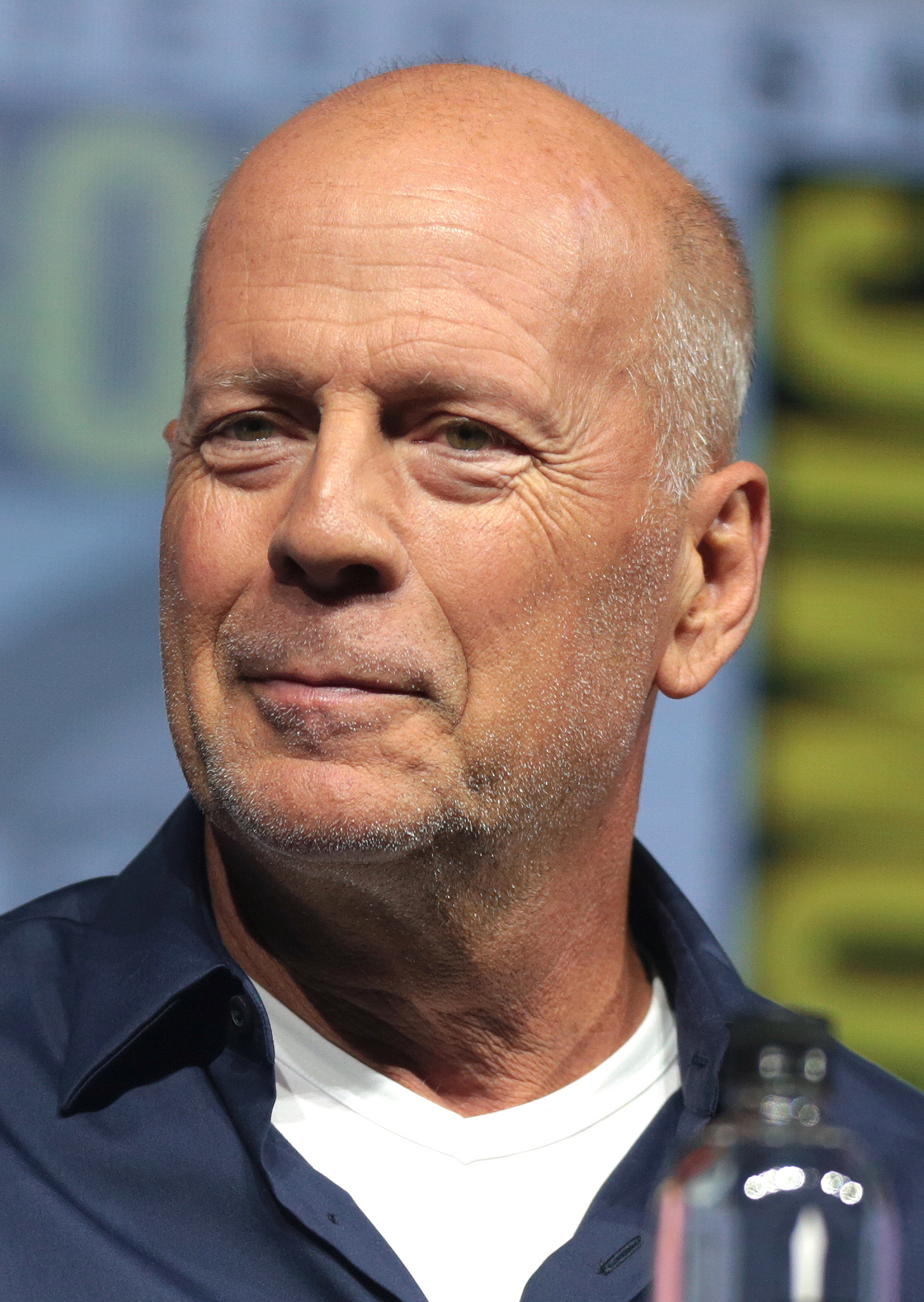
- Willis at the 2018 San Diego Comic-Con
- Born: Walter Bruce Willis; March 19, 1955 (age 71); Idar-Oberstein, West Germany
- Citizenship: United States
- Occupation: Actor
- Years active: 1980–2022
- Works: Filmography
- Spouses: Demi Moore (m. 1987; div. 2000); Emma Heming (m. 2009)
- Children: 5, including Rumer
- Awards: Full list

Walter Bruce Willis (born March 19, 1955) is a retired American actor. Widely recognized as a Hollywood icon of the action genre, he first achieved fame with a leading role on the comedy-drama series Moonlighting (1985–1989) and has appeared in over one hundred films, gaining widespread recognition as an action hero for his portrayal of John McClane in the Die Hard franchise (1988–2013).

Willis's other credits include The Last Boy Scout (1991), Pulp Fiction (1994), 12 Monkeys (1995), The Fifth Element (1997), Armageddon (1998), The Sixth Sense (1999), Unbreakable, The Whole Nine Yards (both 2000), Tears of the Sun (2003), Sin City (2005), The Expendables, Red (both 2010), Looper (2012) and Glass (2019). In the last years of his career, he starred in many low-budget direct-to-video films, which were poorly received. Willis retired in 2022 due to aphasia and was diagnosed with frontotemporal dementia in 2023.

Willis has received various accolades throughout his career, including a Golden Globe Award, two Primetime Emmy Awards and two People's Choice Awards. He received a star on the Hollywood Walk of Fame in 2006. Films featuring Willis have grossed between US$2.64 billion and US$3.05 billion at North American box offices, and he was the eighth-highest-grossing leading actor in 2010s.

== Early life and education ==
Walter Bruce Willis was born on March 19, 1955, in Idar-Oberstein, West Germany; his mother, Marlene, was born in Kassel, Germany, and his father, David Willis (1929–2009), was an American soldier. He has a younger sister, Florence, and two younger brothers, Robert (1959–2001) and David. After being discharged from the military in 1957, his father relocated the family to his hometown of Carneys Point, New Jersey. Willis has described his background as a "long line of blue-collar people". His mother worked in a bank and his father was a welder, master mechanic and factory worker.

Willis spoke with a stutter. He attended Penns Grove High School in Carneys Point Township, where his schoolmates nicknamed him "Buck-Buck". Willis joined the drama club, and found that acting on stage reduced his stutter. He was eventually elected student council president. He graduated from Penns Grove in 1973.

After graduating from high school, Willis worked as a security guard at the Salem Nuclear Power Plant and transported crew members at the DuPont Chambers Works factory in Deepwater. He turned to acting after working as a private investigator, a role he would later play in the comedy-drama series Moonlighting and the action-comedy film The Last Boy Scout.

Willis enrolled in the drama program at Montclair State University, where he was cast in a production of Cat on a Hot Tin Roof. He left the school in 1977, and moved to New York City where he was part of the NBC's page program and worked for Saturday Night Live. In the early 1980s he supported himself as a bartender at various nightspots in Manhattan including Kamikaze, Cafe Central & Chelsea Central, while living in the Hell's Kitchen neighborhood.

== Career ==
=== 1980s: Moonlighting, Die Hard and rise to fame ===
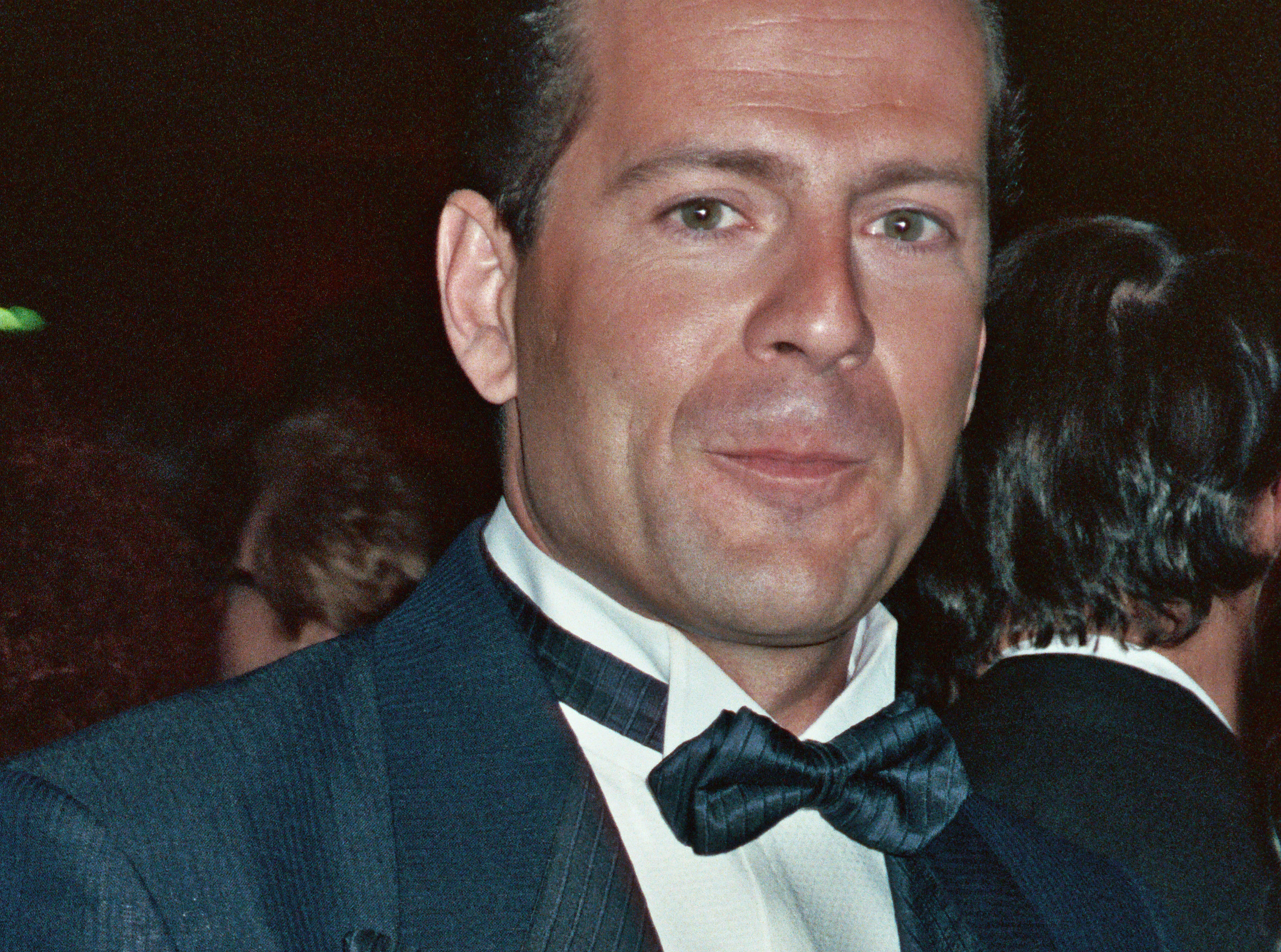
Willis at the 61st Academy Awards in 1989

Willis was cast as David Addison Jr. in the television series Moonlighting (1985–1989), competing against 3,000 other actors for the position. His starring role in Moonlighting, opposite Cybill Shepherd, helped to establish him as a comedic actor. During the show's five seasons, he won an Emmy Award for Outstanding Lead Actor in a Drama Series and a Golden Globe Award for Best Actor – Television Series Musical or Comedy. During the height of the show's success, beverage maker Seagram hired Willis as the pitchman for their Golden Wine Cooler products. The advertising campaign paid Willis US$5–7 million over two years. Willis chose not to renew his contract when he decided to stop drinking alcohol in 1988.

In 1987, Willis obtained his first lead role in the Blake Edwards film Blind Date, co-starring with Kim Basinger and John Larroquette. Edwards cast him again to play the real-life cowboy actor Tom Mix in Sunset (1988). The same year, he starred in an action role in Die Hard (1988) as John McClane. He performed most of his own stunts in the film, and the film grossed $138,708,852 worldwide. Following his success with Die Hard, Willis had a leading role in the drama In Country as Vietnam veteran Emmett Smith and also provided the voice for a talking baby in Look Who's Talking (1989) and the sequel Look Who's Talking Too (1990).

In the late 1980s, Willis enjoyed moderate success as a recording artist, recording an album of pop-blues, The Return of Bruno, credited to Willis's fictional alter ego, Bruno Radolini, supposedly an influential blues musician. The album included the hit single "Respect Yourself" using the Pointer Sisters as guest vocalists. The LP was promoted by a mockumentary featuring scenes of "Bruno" performing at famous events including Woodstock. Willis released a version of the Drifters song "Under the Boardwalk" as a second single; it reached No. 2 on the UK Singles Chart, but was less successful in the US. Willis returned to the recording studio several times.

=== 1990s: Die Hard sequels, Pulp Fiction and dramatic roles ===
Having acquired major personal success and pop culture influence playing John McClane in Die Hard, Willis reprised his role in the sequels Die Hard 2 (1990) and Die Hard with a Vengeance (1995). These first three installments in the Die Hard series grossed over US$700 million internationally and propelled Willis to the first rank of Hollywood action stars. At one point, Die Hard 2 and Ghost, starring Willis's then wife Demi Moore, would occupy the number one and number two spots at the box office, a feat that would not be accomplished again for a married Hollywood couple until 2024.

In the early 1990s, Willis's career suffered a moderate slump, as he starred in flops such as The Bonfire of the Vanities (1990) and Hudson Hawk (1991), although he did find box office success with The Last Boy Scout (1991). He gained more success with Striking Distance (1993) but flopped again with Color of Night (1994): it was savaged by critics but did well in the home video market and became one of the Top 20 most-rented films in the United States in 1995. Maxim also ranked his sex scene in the film as the best in film history.

In 1994, Willis also had a leading role in one part of Quentin Tarantino's acclaimed Pulp Fiction; the film's success gave a boost to his career, and he starred alongside his Look Who's Talking co-star John Travolta. In 1996, he was the executive producer and star of the cartoon Bruno the Kid, which featured a CGI representation of himself. That same year, he starred in Mike Judge's animated film Beavis and Butt-head Do America with his then-wife Demi Moore. In the movie, he plays a drunken criminal named "Muddy Grimes", who mistakenly sends Judge's titular characters to kill his wife, Dallas (voiced by Moore). He then played the lead roles in 12 Monkeys (1995), The Fifth Element (1997) and The Jackal (1997), the latter of which was a box-office success despite negative reviews. These were followed by Mercury Rising (1998) and Breakfast of Champions (1999), which were also poorly reviewed. In 1998, his voice and likeness were featured in the PlayStation video game Apocalypse.

Willis was involved in Broadway Brawler as both producer and lead actor. That production failed, and as compensation he was contracted for three films: Armageddon, The Sixth Sense and Disney's The Kid. Both Armageddon and The Sixth Sense were critical and commercial successes, with the former being the highest-grossing film of 1998 worldwide.

=== 2000s ===
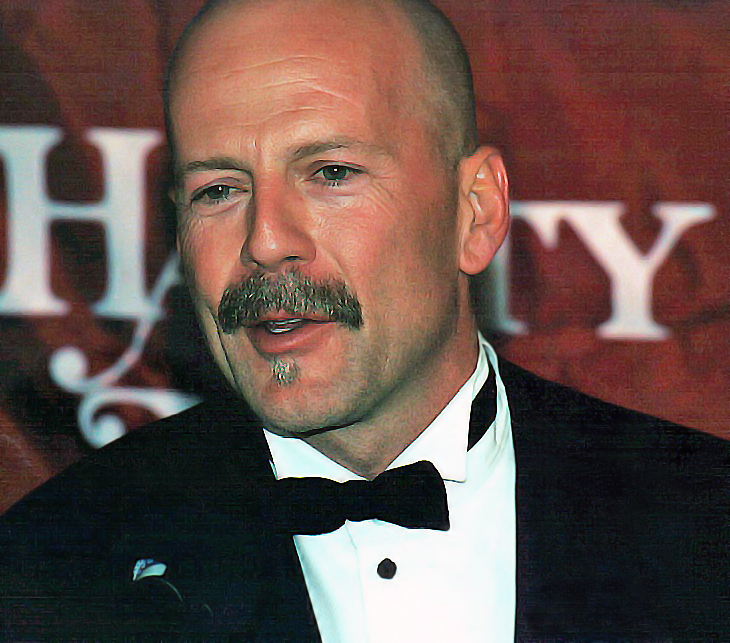
Willis in 2002 after being named Hasty Pudding Theatrical's Man of the Year

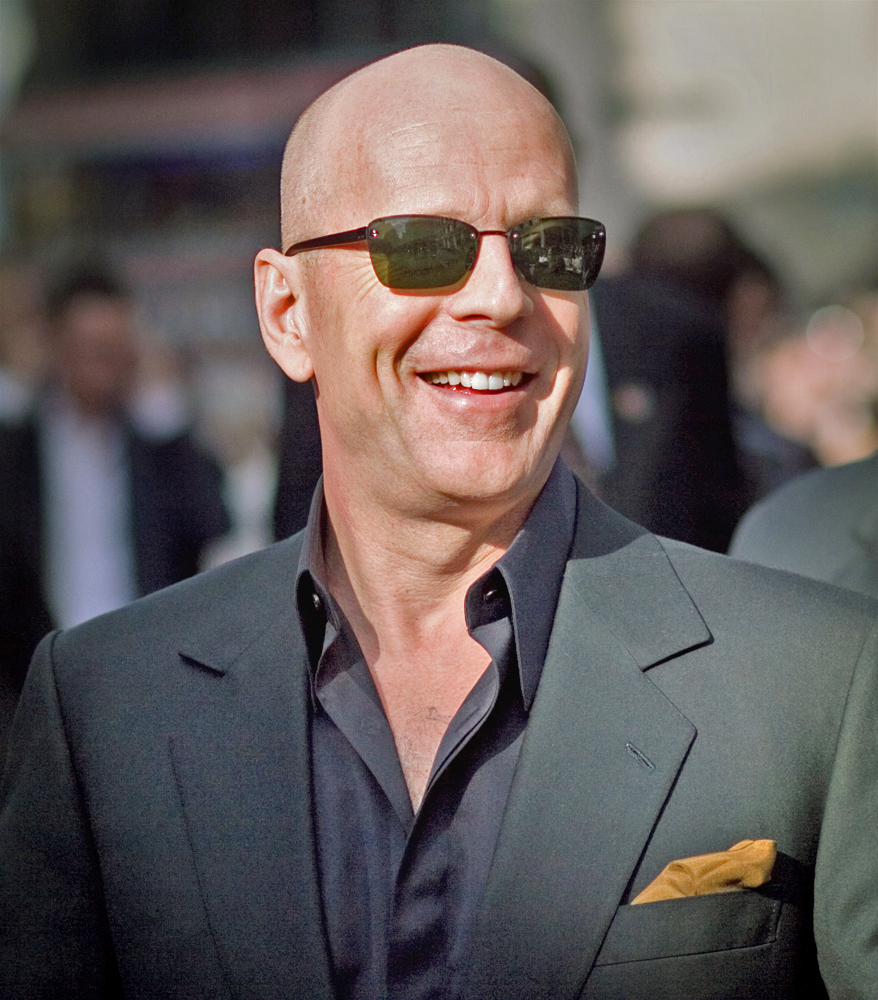
Willis in June 2007 in the premiere of Live Free or Die Hard

In 2000, Willis won an Emmy for Outstanding Guest Actor in a Comedy Series for his work on Friends (in which he played the father of Ross Geller's much-younger girlfriend). He was also nominated for a 2001 American Comedy Award (in the Funniest Male Guest Appearance in a TV Series category) for his work on Friends. Also in 2000, Willis played Jimmy "The Tulip" Tudeski in The Whole Nine Yards alongside Friends star Matthew Perry, and Russ Duritz in Disney's The Kid opposite Emily Mortimer. Willis was originally cast as Terry Benedict in Ocean's Eleven (2001) but dropped out to work on recording an album. In the sequel, Ocean's Twelve (2004), he makes a cameo appearance as himself. In 2005, he appeared in the film adaptation of Sin City. In 2006, he lent his voice as RJ the Raccoon in Over the Hedge. In 2007, he appeared in the Planet Terror half of the double feature Grindhouse as the villain, a mutant soldier. This marked Willis's second collaboration with the director Robert Rodriguez, following Sin City.

Willis appeared on the Late Show with David Letterman several times throughout his career. He filled in for an ill David Letterman on his show on February 26, 2003, when he was supposed to be a guest. On many of his appearances on the show, Willis staged elaborate jokes, such as wearing a day-glo orange suit in honor of the Central Park gates, having one side of his face made up with simulated birdshot wounds after the Harry Whittington shooting, or trying to break a record (a parody of David Blaine) of staying underwater for only twenty seconds.

On April 12, 2007, he appeared again, this time wearing a Sanjaya Malakar wig. On his June 25, 2007 appearance, he wore a mini-wind turbine on his head to accompany a joke about his own fictional documentary titled An Unappealing Hunch (a wordplay on An Inconvenient Truth). Willis also appeared in Japanese Subaru Legacy television commercials. Tying in with this, Subaru did a limited run of Legacys, badged "Subaru Legacy Touring Bruce", in honor of Willis.

Willis has appeared in five films with Samuel L. Jackson (1993's National Lampoon's Loaded Weapon 1, 1994's Pulp Fiction, 1995's Die Hard with a Vengeance, 2000's Unbreakable, and 2019's Glass) and both actors were slated to work together in Black Water Transit, before dropping out. Willis also worked with his eldest daughter, Rumer, in the 2005 film Hostage. In 2006, he appeared in the crime/drama film Alpha Dog, opposite Sharon Stone. In 2007, he appeared in the thriller Perfect Stranger, opposite Halle Berry, and reprised his role as John McClane in Live Free or Die Hard. Subsequently, he appeared in the films What Just Happened (2008) and Surrogates (2009), based on the comic book of the same name.

Willis was slated to play U.S. Army general William R. Peers in director Oliver Stone's Pinkville, a drama about the investigation of the 1968 My Lai massacre. However, due to the 2007 Writers Guild of America strike, the film was canceled. Willis appeared on the 2008 Blues Traveler album North Hollywood Shootout, giving a spoken word performance over an instrumental blues rock jam on the track "Free Willis (Ruminations from Behind Uncle Bob's Machine Shop)". In early 2009, he appeared in an advertising campaign to publicize the insurance company Norwich Union's change of name to Aviva.

=== 2010s ===
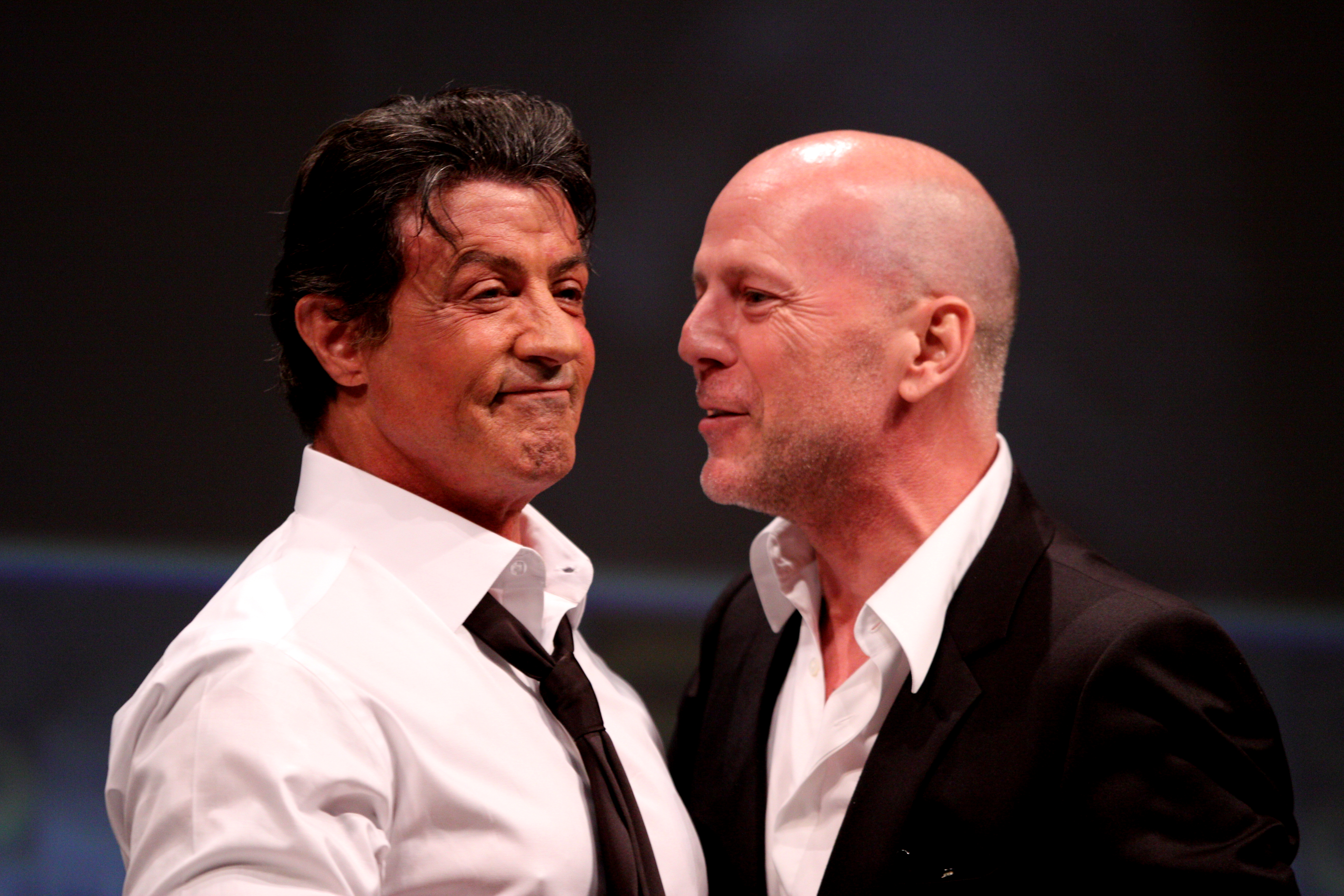
Willis in 2010 with The Expendables co-star Sylvester Stallone

As of 2010, Willis was the eighth highest-grossing actor in a leading role and 12th-highest including supporting roles. Willis starred with Tracy Morgan in the 2010 comedy Cop Out, directed by Kevin Smith, about two police detectives investigating the theft of a baseball card. Willis appeared in the music video for the song "Stylo" by Gorillaz. Also in 2010, he appeared in a cameo with the former Planet Hollywood co-owners and 80s action stars Sylvester Stallone and Arnold Schwarzenegger in the film The Expendables. Willis played the role of CIA agent "Mr. Church". It was the first time the three action stars had appeared on screen together. Although the scene featuring the three was short, it was one of the most highly anticipated scenes in the film. The trio filmed their scene in an empty church on October 24, 2009. Willis next starred in Red, an adaptation of the comic book mini-series of the same name, in which he portrayed Frank Moses. The film was released on October 15, 2010.

Willis starred alongside Bill Murray, Edward Norton, and Frances McDormand in Moonrise Kingdom (2012). Filming took place in Rhode Island under the direction of Wes Anderson, in 2011. Willis returned, in an expanded role, in The Expendables 2 (2012). He appeared alongside Joseph Gordon-Levitt in the sci-fi action film Looper (2012), as the older version of Gordon-Levitt's character, Joe.

Willis teamed up with 50 Cent in a film directed by David Barrett called Fire with Fire, starring opposite Josh Duhamel and Rosario Dawson, about a fireman who must save the love of his life. Willis also joined Vince Vaughn and Catherine Zeta-Jones in Lay the Favorite, directed by Stephen Frears, about a Las Vegas cocktail waitress who becomes an elite professional gambler. The two films were distributed by Lionsgate Entertainment.

Willis reprised his most famous role, John McClane, for a fifth time, starring in A Good Day to Die Hard, which was released on February 14, 2013. In an interview, Willis said: "I have a warm spot in my heart for Die Hard..... it's just the sheer novelty of being able to play the same character over 25 years and still be asked back is fun. It's much more challenging to have to do a film again and try to compete with myself, which is what I do in Die Hard. I try to improve my work every time." That same year, Willis reprised his role as Frank Moses in Red 2.

On October 12, 2013, Willis hosted Saturday Night Live with Katy Perry as a musical guest. In 2015, Willis made his Broadway debut in William Goldman's adaptation of Stephen King's novel Misery opposite Laurie Metcalf at the Broadhurst Theatre. His performance was generally panned by critics, who called it "vacant" and "inert". Willis was the subject of a roast by Comedy Central in a program broadcast on July 29, 2018. Willis played himself in a cameo in the 2019 film The Lego Movie 2: The Second Part.

=== 2020s: Critical decline, health problems and retirement ===
In the final years of his career, Willis starred in many low-budget independent thrillers and science fiction films. He worked primarily with the production companies Emmett/Furla Oasis (which produced 20 films starring Willis) and 308 Entertainment. Most of the films were released direct-to-video and were widely panned. Chris Nashawaty of Esquire described the direct-to-video films as "a profitable safe harbor" for older actors, similar to The Expendables. Willis would often earn US$2 million for two days' work, with an average of 15 minutes' screentime per film. He nonetheless featured heavily in the films' promotional materials, earning them the derogatory nickname "geezer teasers". The Golden Raspberry Awards, an annual award for the year's worst films and performances, created a dedicated category, the Worst Bruce Willis Performance in a 2021 Movie, for Willis's roles in eight films released that year.

Those working on the films later said Willis appeared confused, did not understand why he was there and had to be fed lines through an earpiece. Days before Willis was scheduled to arrive on set for Out of Death (2021), the screenwriter, Bill Lawrence, was instructed to reduce his role and abbreviate his dialogue. The director, Mike Burns, was told to complete all of Willis's scenes in a single day of filming.

On March 30, 2022, Willis's family announced that he was retiring because he had been diagnosed with aphasia, a disorder typically caused by damage to the area of the brain that controls language expression and comprehension. The Golden Raspberry Awards retracted its Willis category, deeming it inappropriate to give a Razzie to someone whose performance was affected by a medical condition. At the time of his retirement, Willis had completed eleven films awaiting release.

== Business activities ==
Willis owns houses in Los Angeles and Penns Grove, New Jersey. He also rents apartments at Trump Tower and in Riverside South, Manhattan. In 2000, Willis and his business partner Arnold Rifkin started a motion picture production company called Cheyenne Enterprises. He left the company to be run solely by Rifkin in 2007 after Live Free or Die Hard. He also owns several small businesses in Hailey, Idaho, including The Mint Bar and The Liberty Theater and was one of the first promoters of Planet Hollywood, with actors Arnold Schwarzenegger and Sylvester Stallone. Willis and the other actors were paid for their appearances and endorsements through an employee stock ownership plan.

In 2009, Willis signed a contract to become the international face of Belvedere SA's Sobieski Vodka in exchange for 3.3% ownership in the company. In 2018, Willis became the brand ambassador of the Hungarian brand Hell Energy Drink.

== Personal life ==
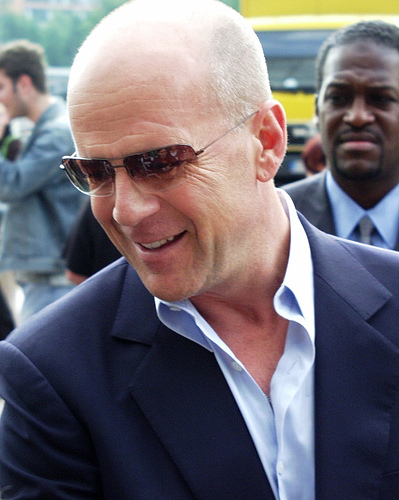
Willis in June 2006

Willis's acting role models are Gary Cooper, Robert De Niro, Steve McQueen and John Wayne. He is left handed. He resides in the Brentwood neighborhood of Los Angeles with his family.

On November 21, 1987, Willis married Demi Moore at the Golden Nugget Las Vegas. On December 20, the couple held a second reception for about 450 guests on a soundstage at Warner Bros. Studios Burbank. They have three daughters: Rumer (b. 1988), Scout (b. 1991), and Tallulah (b. 1994). Willis and Moore announced their separation on June 24, 1998. They filed for divorce on October 18, 2000, and the divorce was finalized later that day. Regarding the divorce, Willis stated: "I felt I had failed as a father and a husband by not being able to make it work." He credited actor Will Smith for helping him cope with the situation. He has maintained a close friendship with both Moore and her subsequent husband, actor Ashton Kutcher, and attended their wedding.

Willis was engaged to actress Brooke Burns until they broke up in 2004 after ten months together. He married model Emma Heming in Turks and Caicos on March 21, 2009; guests included his three daughters, as well as Moore and Kutcher. The ceremony was not legally binding, so the couple wed again in a civil ceremony in Beverly Hills six days later. The couple has two daughters, one born in 2012 and another born in 2014.

In August 2025, Emma said that she and Willis were now living in separate homes. Emma stated that this was due to Willis's declining health, with his new, separate one-story home being better suited to accommodate his progressing frontotemporal dementia.

=== Health ===
On February 16, 2023, Willis's family announced that he had been diagnosed with frontotemporal dementia. According to Gregg Day, a neurologist at the Mayo Clinic's Florida campus, the symptoms include difficulties with language and comprehension, and misinterpretation of instructions. In a statement, the family said that Willis's condition had progressed and that "challenges with communication are just one symptom of the disease". They expressed hope that media attention on Willis would raise awareness about the disease. Emma Willis's memoir The Unexpected Journey, which focuses on her experience as her husband's caregiver, was published in September 2025.

As his condition progressed, Willis was moved to a separate, one-story home containing an on-site team providing full time support. In an August 2025 interview, Emma said the decision was made to prioritize the needs of their two daughters, and added that she believed Willis would have made the choice himself if he could. She said the family visits Willis "a lot" for meals and to spend time together.

=== Military interests ===
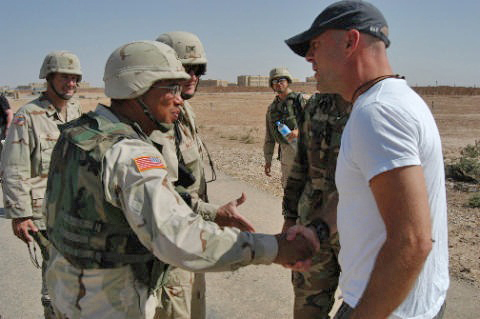
Willis meeting Brigadier General Albert Bryant Jr. and deployed soldiers from the 4th Infantry Division, in Tikrit, Iraq, during his USO tour in September 2003

Throughout his film career, Willis has depicted several military characters in films such as In Country, The Siege, Hart's War, Tears of the Sun, Grindhouse, and G.I. Joe: Retaliation. Willis grew up in a military family. Willis has donated Girl Scout cookies to the United States armed forces. In 2002, Willis's then eight-year-old daughter, Tallulah, suggested that he purchase Girl Scout cookies to send to troops. Willis purchased 12,000 boxes of cookies, and they were distributed to sailors aboard USS John F. Kennedy and other troops stationed throughout the Middle East at the time.

In 2003, Willis visited Iraq as part of the USO tour, singing to the troops with his band, The Accelerators. Willis considered joining the military to help fight the second Iraq War, but was deterred by his age. It was believed he offered US$1 million to any noncombatant who turned in terrorist leaders Osama bin Laden, Ayman al-Zawahiri, or Abu Musab al-Zarqawi; in the June 2007 issue of Vanity Fair, however, he clarified that the statement was made hypothetically and not meant to be taken literally. Willis has also criticized the media for its coverage of the war, complaining that the press was more likely to focus on the negative aspects of the war:

I went to Iraq because what I saw when I was over there was soldiers—young kids for the most part—helping people in Iraq; helping getting the power turned back on, helping get hospitals open, helping get the water turned back on and you don't hear any of that on the news. You hear, "X number of people were killed today," which I think does a huge disservice. It's like spitting on these young men and women who are over there fighting to help this country.

=== Religious beliefs ===
Willis was a Lutheran, but says he no longer practices. In a July 1998 interview with George magazine, he said: "Organized religions in general, in my opinion, are dying forms. They were all very important when we didn't know why the sun moved, why weather changed, why hurricanes occurred, or volcanoes happened. Modern religion is the end trail of modern mythology. But there are people who interpret the Bible literally. Literally! I choose not to believe that's the way. And that's what makes America cool, you know?"

During the Tears of the Sun premiere in March 2003, when asked by a Hollywood.tv reporter how he stays grounded in Hollywood, Willis said: "I just thank God every day for [...] everything great that's come my way."

=== Political views ===
In 1988, Willis and then-wife Demi Moore campaigned for then Democratic Massachusetts governor Michael Dukakis's presidential campaign in the 1988 presidential elections. In the 1992 presidential election, however, he supported President George H. W. Bush for re-election and was an outspoken critic of Bill Clinton. In 1996, he declined to endorse Clinton's Republican opponent Bob Dole because Dole criticized Demi Moore for her role in the film Striptease. Willis was an invited speaker at the 2000 Republican National Convention, and supported George W. Bush that year.

In 2006, Willis said that the United States should intervene more extensively in Colombia to end drug trafficking from that nation. In several interviews, Willis has said that he supports increased salaries for teachers and police officers, and that he is disappointed in the United States foster care system and its treatment of Native Americans. Willis has supported gun rights, saying: "Everyone has a right to bear arms. If you take guns away from legal gun owners, then the only people who have guns are the bad guys."

In February 2006, when Willis was in Manhattan to promote his film 16 Blocks, he was asked his opinion on the Bush administration. Willis responded: "I'm sick of answering this fucking question. I'm a Republican only as far as I want a smaller government, I want less government intrusion. I want them to stop shitting on my money and your money and tax dollars that we give 50 percent of every year. I want them to be fiscally responsible and I want these goddamn lobbyists out of Washington. Do that and I'll say I'm a Republican. I hate the government, OK? I'm apolitical. Write that down. I'm not a Republican". Willis did not make any contributions or public endorsements in the 2008 presidential campaign. In several June 2007 interviews, he said that he maintains some beliefs aligned with Republican ideas.

On August 17, 2006, Willis was named in a Los Angeles Times advertisement that condemned Hamas and Hezbollah and supported Israel in the 2006 Israel-Lebanon war. In the 2012 presidential election, Willis said that he had a negative opinion of Mitt Romney.

== Acting credits and accolades ==
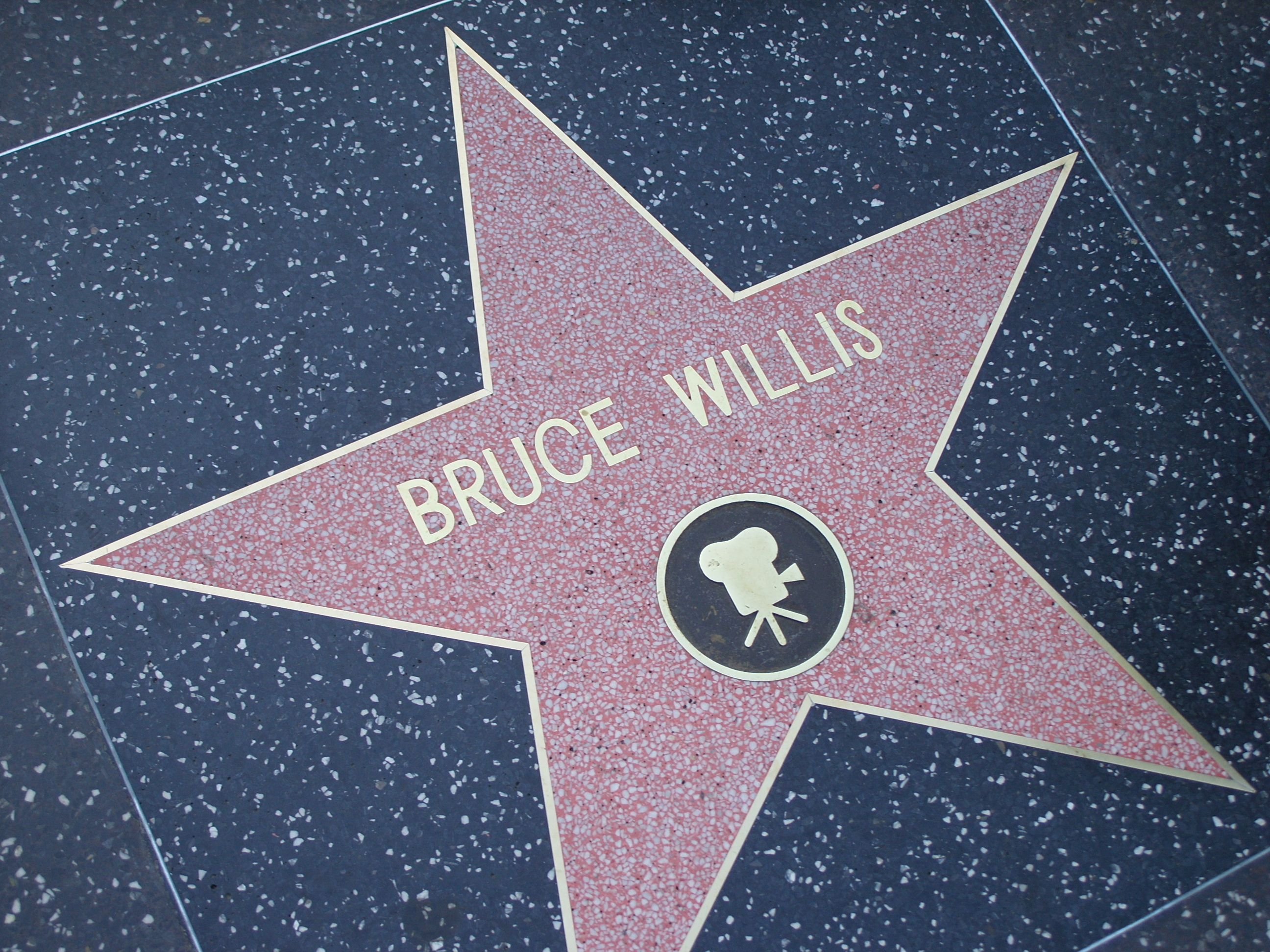
Willis's star on the Hollywood Walk of Fame

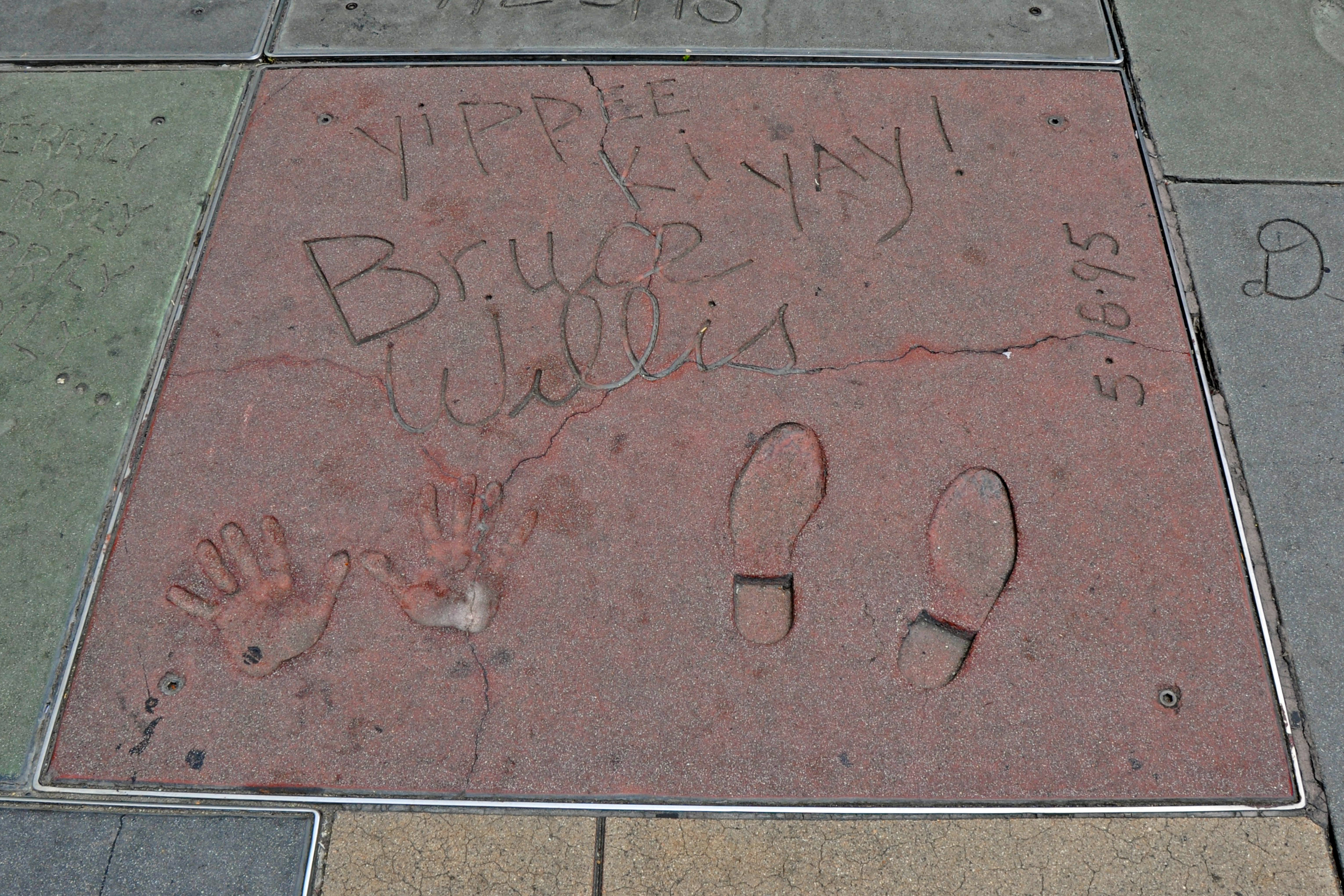
Willis's hands and footprints at Grauman's Chinese Theatre

Willis has won a variety of awards and has received various honors throughout his career in television and film.

- 1987: Golden Apple Awards honored with the Sour Apple.
- 1994: Maxim magazine ranked his sex scene in Color of Night the No. 1 sex scene in film history
- 2000: American Cinematheque Gala Tribute honored Willis with the American Cinematheque Award for an extraordinary artist in the entertainment industry who is fully engaged in his or her work and is committed to making a significant contribution to the art of the motion pictures.
- 2002: The Hasty Pudding Man of the Year award from Harvard's Hasty Pudding Theatricals – given to performers who give a lasting and impressive contribution to the world of entertainment
- 2002: Appointed as national spokesman for Children in Foster Care by President George W. Bush; Willis wrote online: "I saw Foster Care as a way for me to serve my country in a system by which shining a little bit of light could benefit a great deal by helping kids who were literally wards of the government."
- 2005: Golden Camera Award for Best International Actor by the Manaki Brothers Film Festival.
- 2006: Honored by French government for his contributions to the film industry; appointed an Officer of the French Order of Arts and Letters in a ceremony in Paris; the French Prime Minister stated: "This is France's way of paying tribute to an actor who epitomizes the strength of American cinema, the power of the emotions that he invites us to share on the world's screens and the sturdy personalities of his legendary characters".
- 2006: Honored with a star on the Hollywood Walk of Fame on October 16; located at 6915 Hollywood Boulevard and it was the 2,321st star awarded in its history; at the reception, he stated: "I used to come down here and look at these stars and I could never quite figure out what you were supposed to do to get one...time has passed and now here I am doing this, and I'm still excited. I'm still excited to be an actor".
- 2011: Inducted into the New Jersey Hall of Fame
- 2013: Promoted to the dignity of Commander of the Order of Arts and Letters on February 11 by French Minister of Culture Aurélie Filippetti

== Discography ==
=== Studio albums ===
Title	Album details	Peak chart positions						Certifications
Title	Album details	US	US R&B /HH	FIN	NL	SWE	UK	Certifications
The Return of Bruno	Released: January 20, 1987; Label: Motown; Format: LP, CD	14	27	28	53	36	4	RIAA: Gold; MC: Platinum; BPI: Gold
If It Don't Kill You, It Just Makes You Stronger	Released: October 3, 1989; Label: Motown; Format: LP, CD	—	—	9	—	—	—	

=== Compilations/guest appearances ===
- 1986: Moonlighting soundtrack; track "Good Lovin'"
- 1991: Hudson Hawk soundtrack; tracks "Swinging on a Star" and "Side by Side", both duets with Danny Aiello
- 2000: The Whole Nine Yards soundtrack; track "Tenth Avenue Tango"
- 2001: Classic Bruce Willis: The Universal Masters Collection (Polygram Int'l, OCLC 71124889)
- 2003: Rugrats Go Wild soundtrack; "Big Bad Cat" with Chrissie Hynde and "Lust for Life"
- 2008: North Hollywood Shootout, Blues Traveler; track "Free Willis (Ruminations from Behind Uncle Bob's Machine Shop)"

=== Singles ===
Title	Year	Peak chart positions										Album
Title	Year	US	US AC	US R&B /HH	AUS	CAN	FIN	NL	NZ	SWE	UK	Album
"Respect Yourself"	1986	5	22	20	57	8	20	57	26	—	7	The Return of Bruno
"Under the Boardwalk"	1987	59	20	72	—	—	20	14	50	20	2	The Return of Bruno
"Secret Agent Man"	1987	—	—	—	—	—	—	—	—	—	43	The Return of Bruno
"Young Blood"	1987	68	—	—	—	—	—	—	—	—	—	The Return of Bruno
"Comin' Right Up"	1987	—	—	—	—	—	—	—	—	—	73	The Return of Bruno
"Save the Last Dance for Me"	1989	—	—	—	—	—	29	—	—	—	80	If It Don't Kill You, It Just Makes You Stronger
"Turn It Up (A Little Louder)"	1989		—	—	—	—	—	—	—	—	—	If It Don't Kill You, It Just Makes You Stronger
