= 1987 Stinkers Bad Movie Awards =

10th Award ceremony by the Stinkers Bad Movie Awards

The 10th Stinkers Bad Movie Awards were released by the Hastings Bad Cinema Society in 1988 to honor the worst films the film industry had to offer in 1987. As follows, there was only a Worst Picture category with provided commentary for each nominee, as well as a list of films that were also considered for the final list but ultimately failed to make the cut (32 films total).

== Worst Picture Ballot ==
Film	Production company(s)
Spaceballs	MGM, United Artists
The Garbage Pail Kids Movie	Paramount Pictures, Atlantic Releasing
Ishtar	Columbia Pictures
Leonard Part 6	Columbia Pictures
Who's That Girl	Warner Bros.

=== Dishonourable Mentions ===
- Allan Quatermain and the Lost City of Gold (Cannon)
- The Allnighter (Universal)
- The Barbarians (Cannon)
- Beverly Hills Cop II (Paramount)
- Burglar (Warner Bros.)
- The Care Bears Adventure in Wonderland (Cineplex Odeon)
- Creepshow 2 (New World)
- Ernest Goes to Camp (Touchstone)
- Fatal Beauty (MGM)
- Fire and Ice (Concorde)
- From the Hip (De Laurentiis)
- Harry and the Hendersons (Universal)
- Hello Mary Lou: Prom Night II (Samuel Goldwyn)
- House II: The Second Story (New World)
- It's Alive III: Island of the Alive (Warner Bros.)
- Jaws: The Revenge (Universal)
- Light of Day (TriStar)
- Mannequin (Fox)
- Masters of the Universe (Cannon)
- Meatballs III (Moviestore Entertainment)
- Million Dollar Mystery (De Laurentiis)
- Over the Top (Warner Bros.)
- Penitentiary III (Cannon)
- Police Academy 4: Citizens On Patrol (Warner Bros.)
- Ratboy (Warner Bros.)
- Revenge of the Nerds II: Nerds in Paradise (Fox)
- Silent Night, Deadly Night Part 2 (MCEG Productions, Inc.)
- The Squeeze (TriStar)
- Surf Nazis Must Die (Troma)
- Teen Wolf Too (Atlantic)
- Tough Guys Don't Dance (Cannon)
- The Trouble with Spies (De Laurentiis)

== See also ==
- 8th Golden Raspberry Awards
