= 8th Golden Raspberry Awards =

Award for worst cinematic under-achievements in 1987

- Date: April 10, 1988
- Site: Hollywood Roosevelt Hotel, California

Highlights
- Worst Picture: Leonard Part 6
- Most awards: Leonard Part 6 (3)
- Most nominations: Jaws: The Revenge / Tough Guys Don't Dance (7)

The 8th Golden Raspberry Awards were held on April 10, 1988, at the Hollywood Roosevelt Hotel to recognize the worst the film industry had to offer in 1987. Leonard Part 6 was the biggest "winner" with three awards out of five nominations. Although he did not attend the ceremony, actor/producer/co-writer Bill Cosby later accepted all his awards on The Late Show.

== Awards and nominations ==
Winner (in bold)
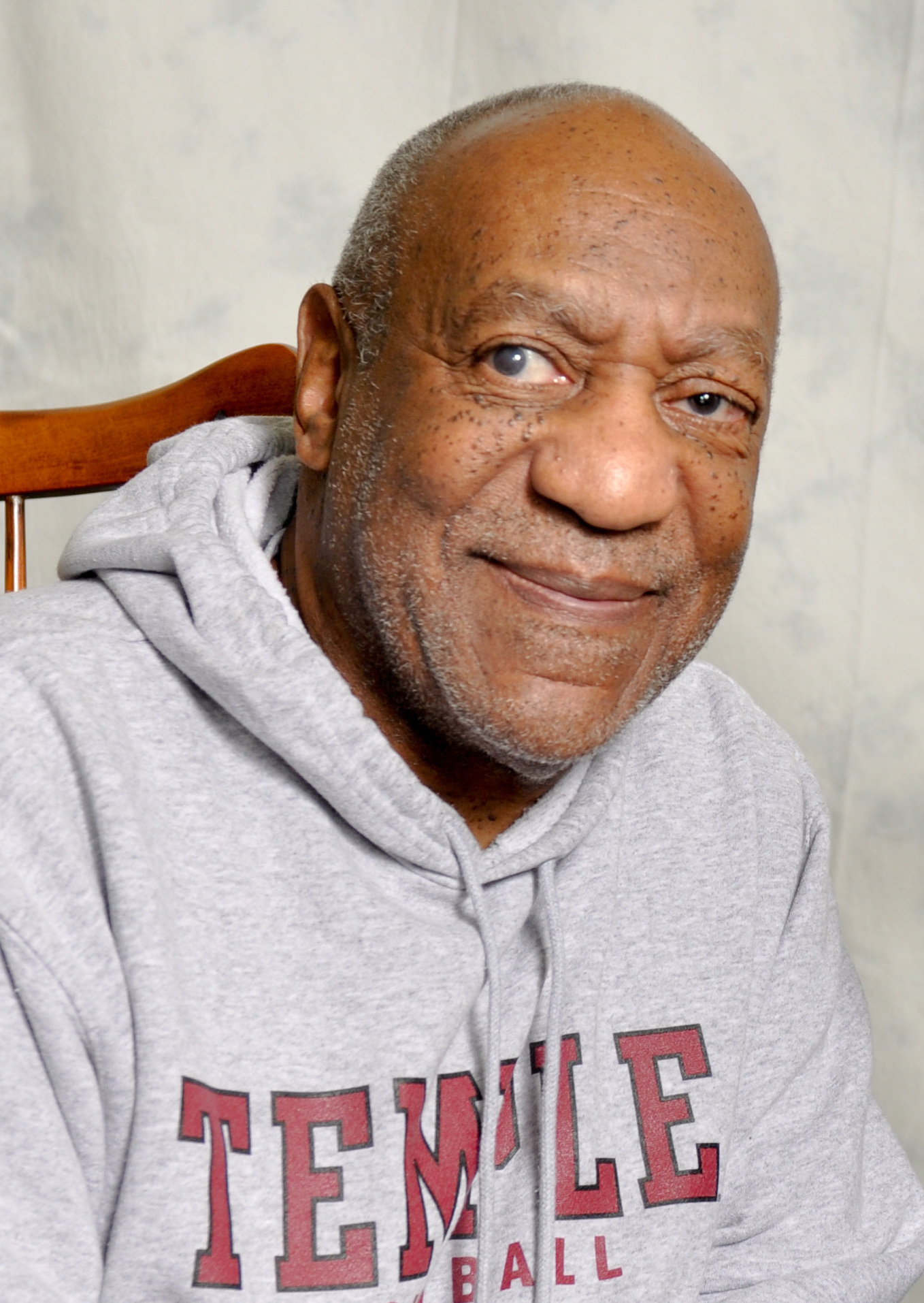
Bill Cosby, Worst Picture and Worst Screenplay co-winner, and Worst Actor winner.

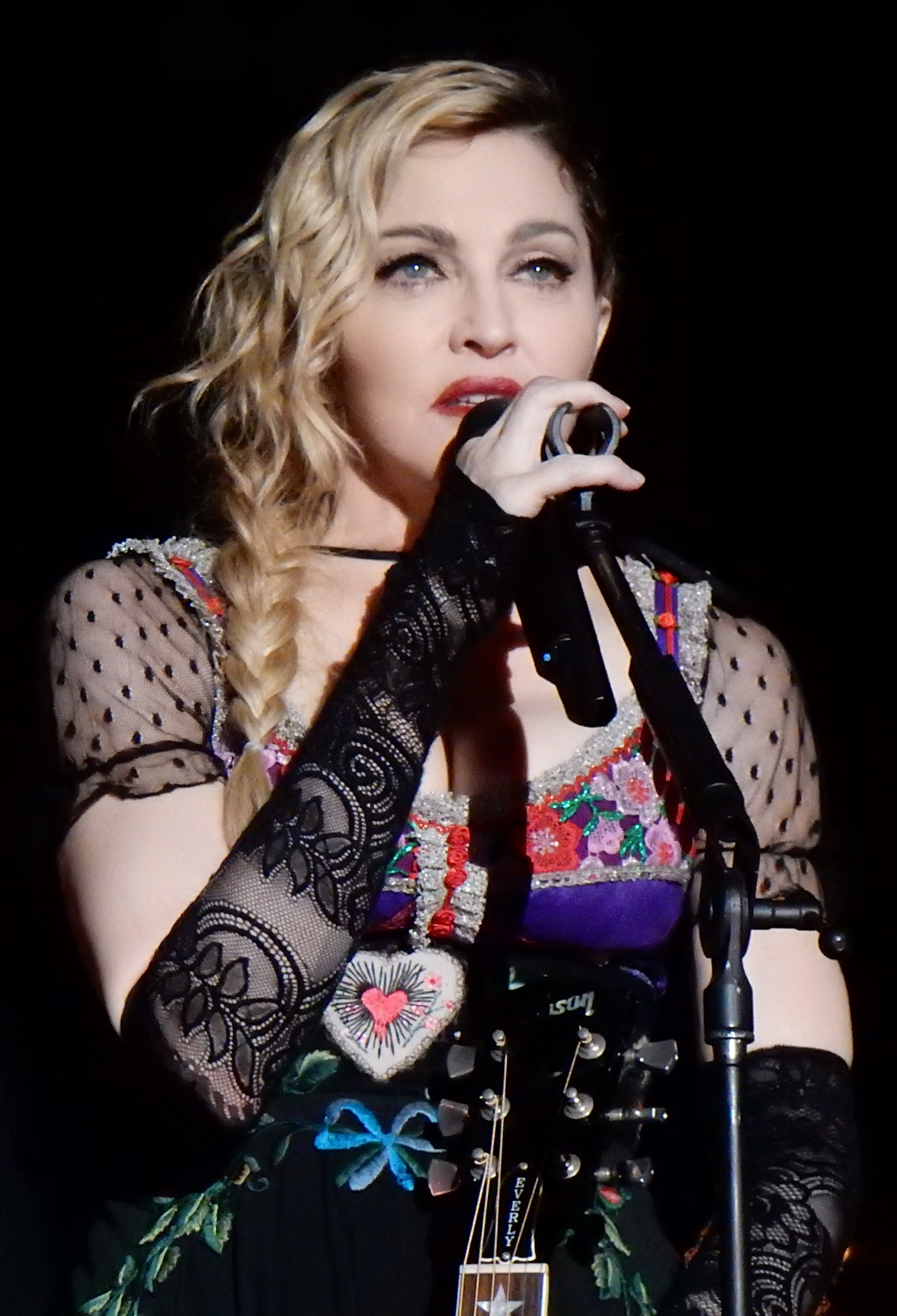
Madonna, Worst Actress winner.

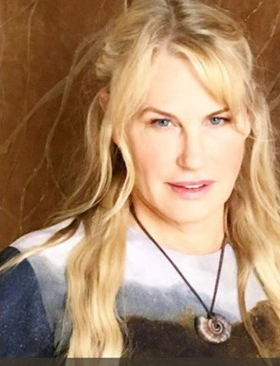
Daryl Hannah, Worst Supporting Actress winner.

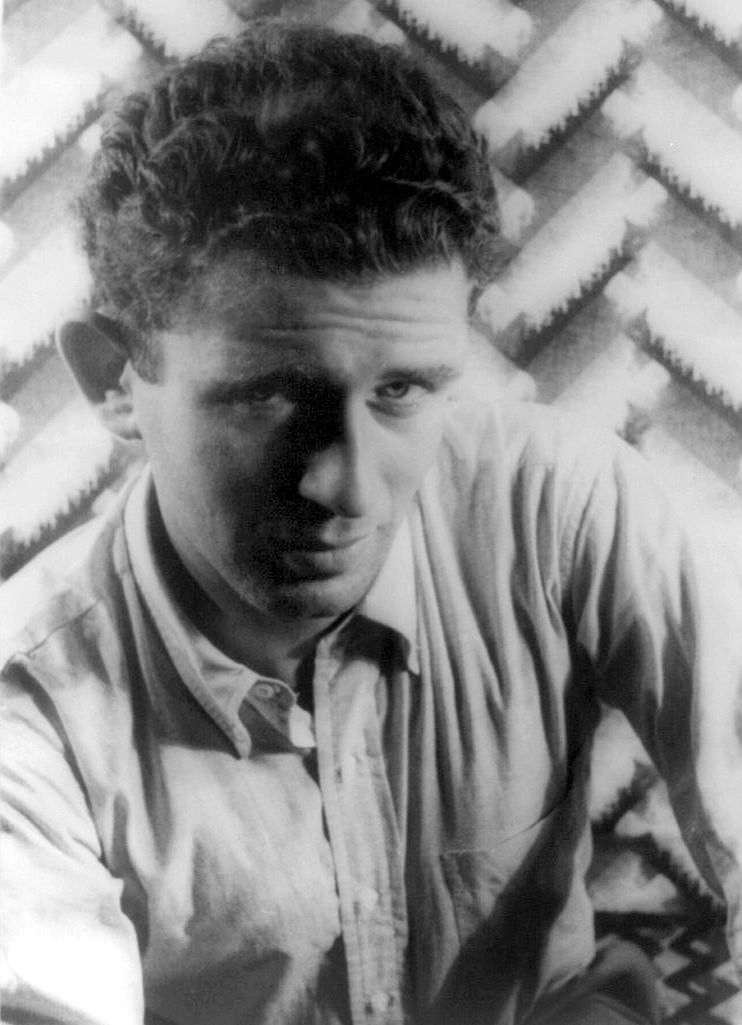
Norman Mailer, Worst Director co-winner.

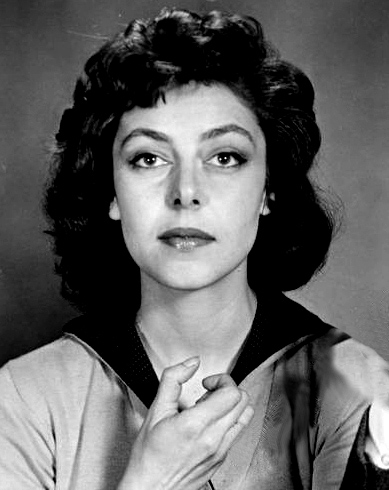
Elaine May, Worst Director co-winner.

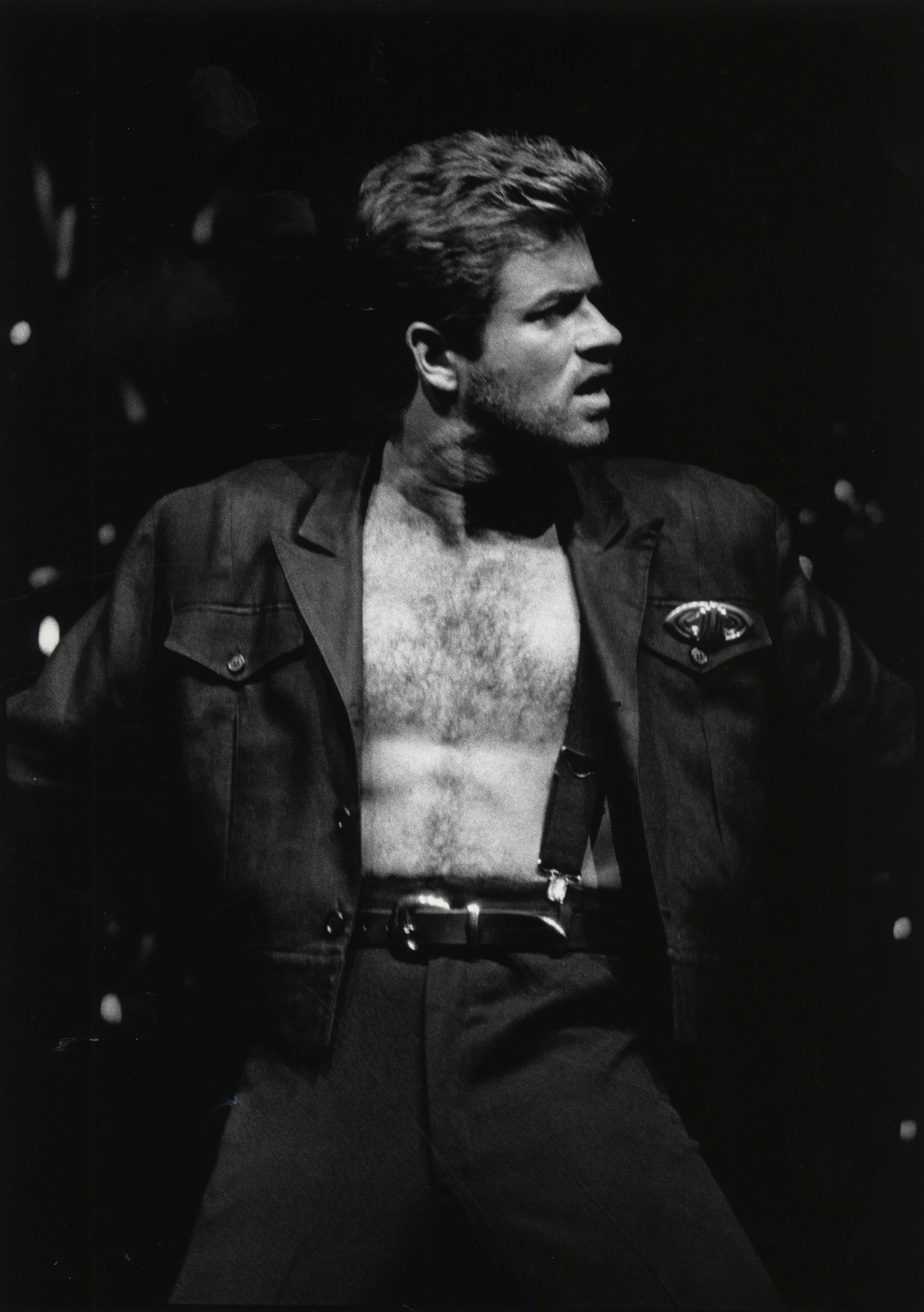
George Michael, Worst Original Song winner.

Category	Recipient
Worst Picture	**Leonard Part 6 – (Columbia) – Bill Cosby**
Worst Picture	Ishtar – (Columbia) – Warren Beatty
Worst Picture	Jaws: The Revenge – (Universal) – Joseph Sargent
Worst Picture	Tough Guys Don't Dance – (Cannon) – Menahem Golan and Yoram Globus
Worst Picture	Who's That Girl – (Warner Bros.) – Rosilyn Heller and Bernard Williams
Worst Actor	**Bill Cosby in Leonard Part 6 as Leonard Parker**
Worst Actor	"Bruce the Shark" in Jaws: The Revenge
Worst Actor	Judd Nelson in From the Hip as Robin "Stormy" Weathers
Worst Actor	Ryan O'Neal in Tough Guys Don't Dance as Tim Madden
Worst Actor	Sylvester Stallone in Over the Top as Lincoln Hawk
Worst Actress	**Madonna in Who's That Girl as Nikki Finn**
Worst Actress	Lorraine Gary in Jaws: The Revenge as Ellen Brody
Worst Actress	Sondra Locke in Ratboy as Nikki Morrison
Worst Actress	Debra Sandlund in Tough Guys Don't Dance as Patty Lareine
Worst Actress	Sharon Stone in Allan Quatermain and the Lost City of Gold as Jesse Huston
Worst Supporting Actor	**David Mendenhall in Over the Top as Michael Hawk**
Worst Supporting Actor	Billy Barty in Masters of the Universe as Gwildor
Worst Supporting Actor	Tom Bosley in Million Dollar Mystery as Sidney Preston
Worst Supporting Actor	Michael Caine in Jaws: The Revenge as Hoagie Newcombe
Worst Supporting Actor	Mack Dryden and Jamie Alcroft in Million Dollar Mystery as Fred and Bob (respectively)
Worst Supporting Actress	**Daryl Hannah in Wall Street as Darien Taylor**
Worst Supporting Actress	Gloria Foster in Leonard Part 6 as Medusa Johnson
Worst Supporting Actress	Mariel Hemingway in Superman IV: The Quest for Peace as Lacy Warfield
Worst Supporting Actress	Grace Jones in Siesta as Conchita
Worst Supporting Actress	Isabella Rossellini in Siesta and Tough Guys Don't Dance as Marie and Madeleine Regency (respectively)
Worst Director	**Norman Mailer for Tough Guys Don't Dance** (tie)
Worst Director	**Elaine May for Ishtar** (tie)
Worst Director	James Foley for Who's That Girl
Worst Director	Joseph Sargent for Jaws: The Revenge
Worst Director	Paul Weiland for Leonard Part 6
Worst Screenplay	**Leonard Part 6, screenplay by Jonathan Reynolds, story by Bill Cosby**
Worst Screenplay	Ishtar, written by Elaine May
Worst Screenplay	Jaws: The Revenge, screenplay by Michael deGuzma, based on characters created by Peter Benchley
Worst Screenplay	Tough Guys Don't Dance, screenplay by Norman Mailer, based on his novel
Worst Screenplay	Who's That Girl, screenplay by Andrew Smith and Ken Finkleman, story by Smith
Worst New Star	**David Mendenhall in Over the Top as Michael Hawk**
Worst New Star	The Garbage Pail Kids (Ali Gator, Greaser Greg, Nat Nerd, Foul Phil, Messy Tessie, Valerie Vomit and Windy Winston) in The Garbage Pail Kids Movie
Worst New Star	David and Peter Paul (The Barbarian Brothers) in The Barbarians as Gore and Kutchek (respectively)
Worst New Star	Debra Sandlund in Tough Guys Don't Dance as Patty Lareine
Worst New Star	Jim Varney in Ernest Goes to Camp as Ernest P. Worrell
Worst Original Song	**"I Want Your Sex" from Beverly Hills Cop II, written by George Michael**
Worst Original Song	"El Coco Loco (So, So Bad)" from Who's That Girl, written by Coati Mundi
Worst Original Song	"Let's Go to Heaven in My Car" from Police Academy 4: Citizens on Patrol, written by Brian Wilson, Eugene E. Landy, and Gary Usher
Worst Original Song	"Million Dollar Mystery" from Million Dollar Mystery, written by Barry Mann and John Lewis Parker
Worst Original Song	"You Can Be a Garbage Pail Kid" from The Garbage Pail Kids Movie, written by Michael Lloyd
Worst Visual Effects	**Jaws: The Revenge, special effects supervisor: Henry Millar**
Worst Visual Effects	The Garbage Pail Kids Movie, animatronics by John Buechler, Mechanical Make-Up Imageries, Inc.
Worst Visual Effects	Superman IV: The Quest for Peace, special effects supervisors: Harrison Ellenshaw and John Evans

== Films with multiple nominations ==
These films garnered multiple nominations:

Nominations	Films
7	Jaws: The Revenge
7	Tough Guys Don't Dance
5	Leonard Part 6
5	Who's That Girl
4	Million Dollar Mystery
3	The Garbage Pail Kids Movie
3	Ishtar
3	Over the Top
2	Siesta
2	Superman IV: The Quest for Peace

== See also ==
- 1987 in film
- 60th Academy Awards
- 41st British Academy Film Awards
- 45th Golden Globe Awards
