= 3rd Independent Spirit Awards =

US film awards ceremony in 1988

- Date: February 11, 1988
- Site: Los Angeles, California; U.S.
- Hosted by: Buck Henry

Highlights
- Best Film: River's Edge
- Most awards: The Dead (2); River's Edge (2)
- Most nominations: Matewan (6)

The 3rd Independent Spirit Awards, honoring the best in independent filmmaking for 1987, were announced on February 11, 1988. The ceremony was hosted by Buck Henry and was held at 385 North, a restaurant in Los Angeles.

== Winners and nominees ==
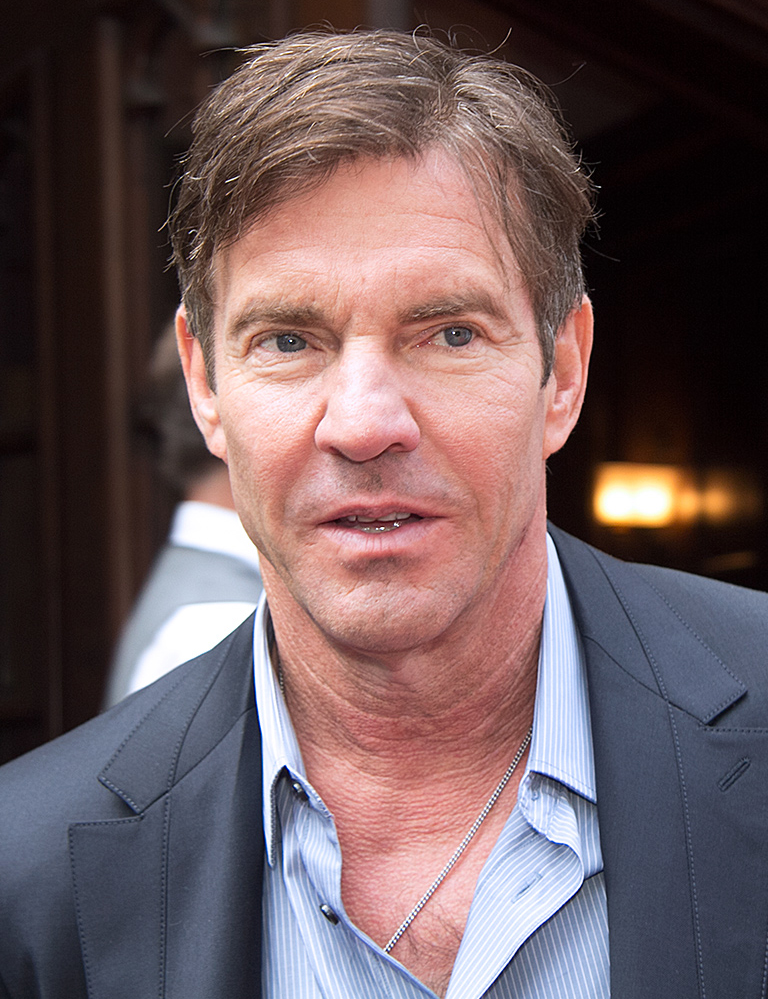
Dennis Quaid, Best Male Lead winner

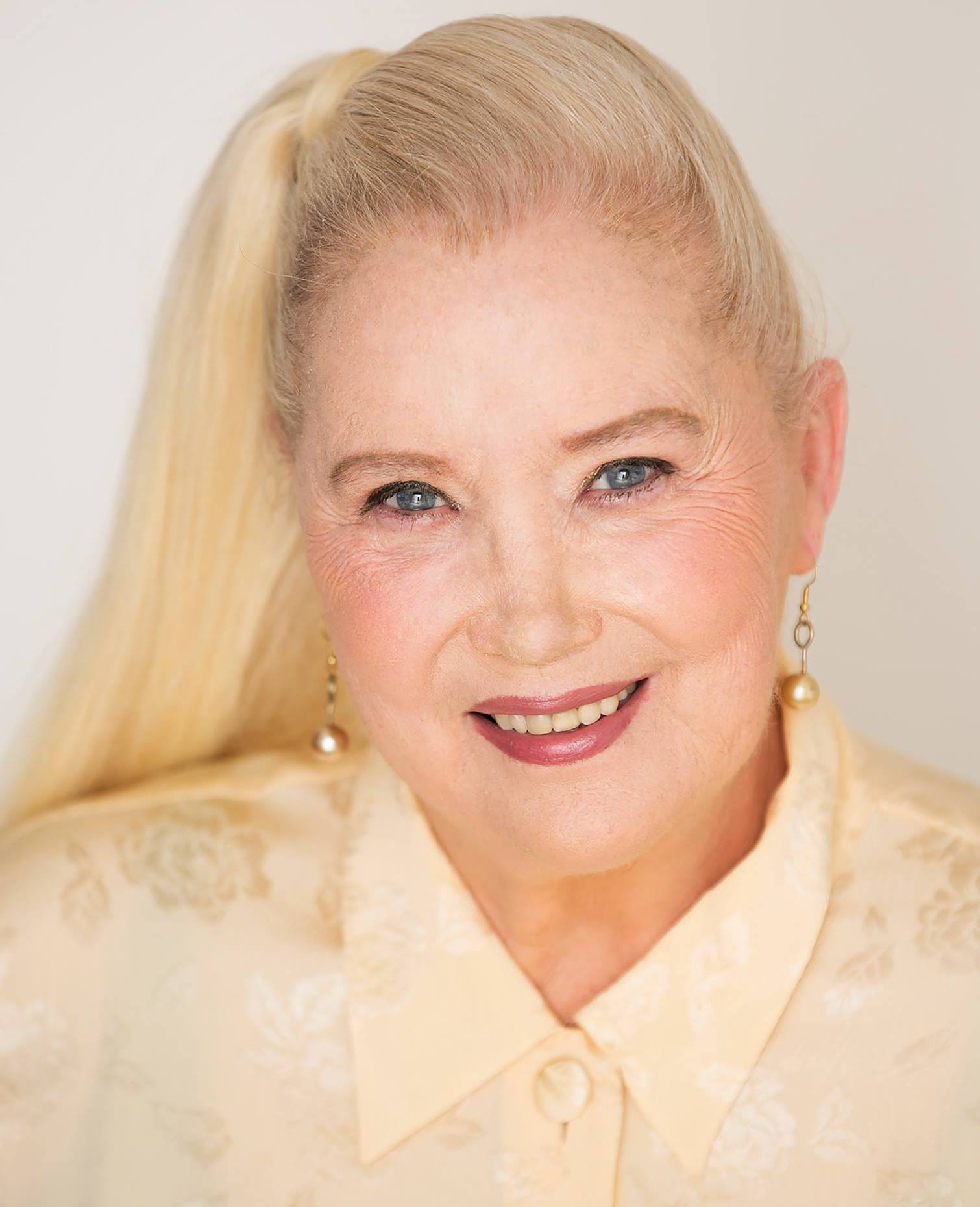
Sally Kirkland, Best Female Lead winner

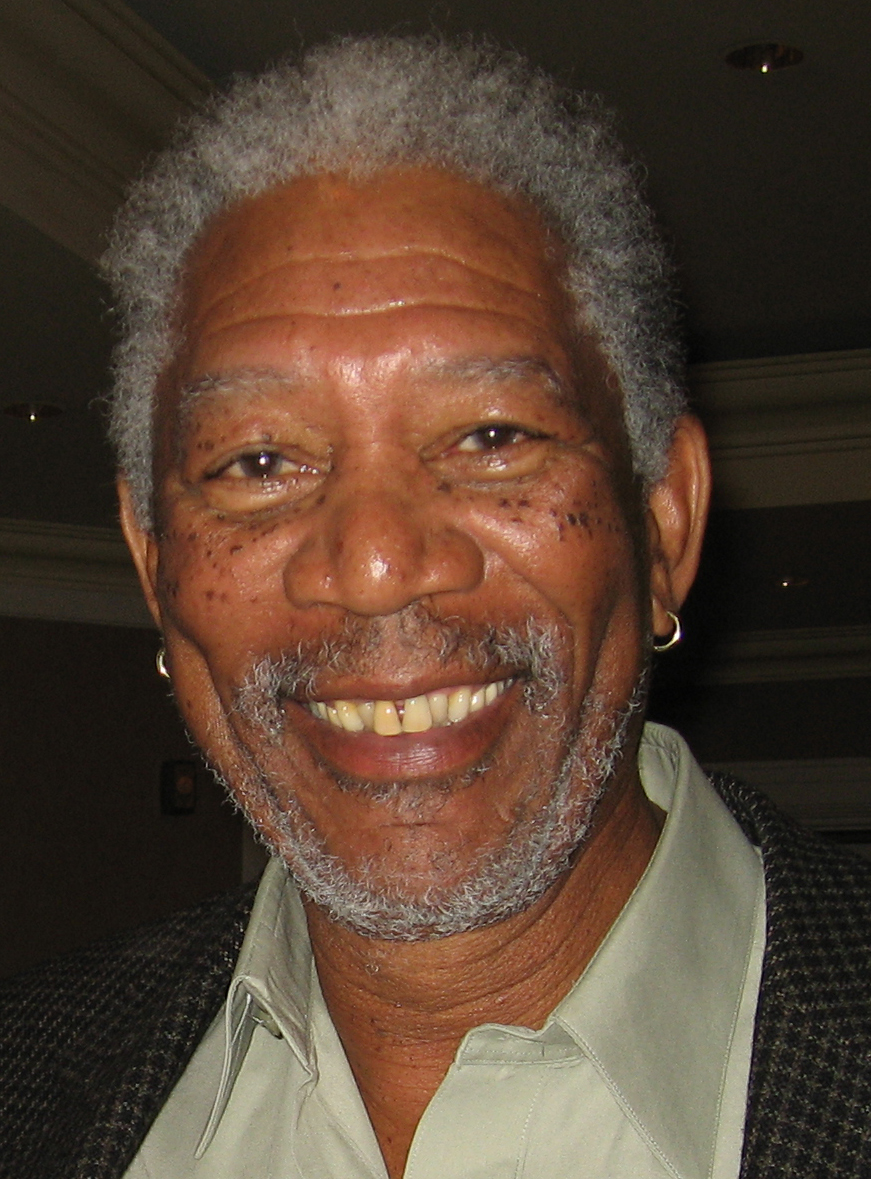
Morgan Freeman, Best Supporting Male winner

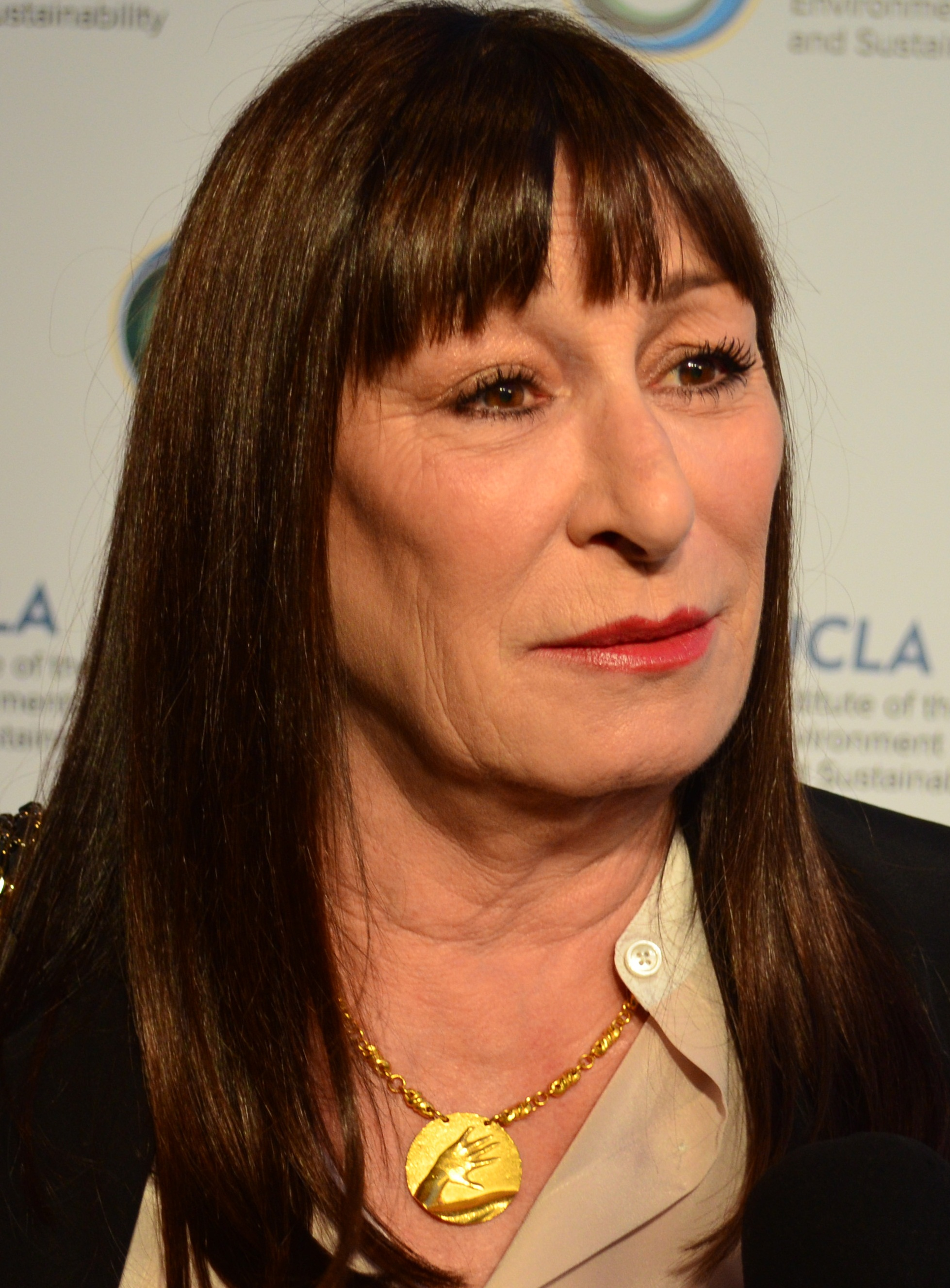
Anjelica Huston, Best Supporting Female winner

Best Feature	Best Director
River's Edge: The Big Easy; The Dead; Matewan; Swimming to Cambodia; Tough Guys Don't Dance	John Huston – The Dead: Jonathan Demme – Swimming to Cambodia; Tim Hunter – River's Edge; Jim McBride – The Big Easy; John Sayles – Matewan
Best Male Lead	Best Female Lead
Dennis Quaid – The Big Easy: Spalding Gray – Swimming to Cambodia; Terry O'Quinn – The Stepfather; Mickey Rourke – Barfly; James Woods – Best Seller	Sally Kirkland – Anna: Lillian Gish – The Whales of August; Debra Sandlund – Tough Guys Don't Dance; Louise Smith – Working Girls; Joanne Woodward – The Glass Menagerie
Best Supporting Male	Best Supporting Female
Morgan Freeman – Street Smart: Wings Hauser – Tough Guys Don't Dance; James Earl Jones – Matewan; Vincent Price – The Whales of August; David Strathairn – Matewan	Anjelica Huston – The Dead: Karen Allen – The Glass Menagerie; Kathy Baker – Street Smart; Martha Plimpton – Shy People; Ann Sothern – The Whales of August
Best Screenplay	Best Cinematography
River's Edge – Neal Jimenez: Anna – Agnieszka Holland; The Dead – Tony Huston; Matewan – John Sayles; Swimming to Cambodia – Spalding Gray	Matewan – Haskell Wexler: Barfly – Robby Müller; The Dead – Fred Murphy; Slam Dance – Amir Mokri; Tough Guys Don't Dance – John Bailey
Best First Feature	Best International Film
Dirty Dancing – Emile Ardolino: Anna – Yurek Bogayevicz; Hollywood Shuffle – Robert Townsend; Siesta – Mary Lambert; Waiting for the Moon – Jill Godmilow	My Life as a Dog • Sweden: Au revoir les enfants • France / West Germany; Hope and Glory • United Kingdom; Prick Up Your Ears • United Kingdom; Tampopo • Japan

=== Films with multiple nominations and awards ===
Films that received multiple nominations
Nominations	Film
6	Matewan
5	The Dead
4	Swimming to Cambodia
4	Tough Guys Don't Dance
3	Anna
3	The Big Easy
3	River's Edge
3	The Whales of August
2	Barfly
2	The Glass Menagerie
2	Street Smart

Films that won multiple awards
Awards	Film
2	The Dead
2	River's Edge
