= Leonard Part 6 =

1987 film by Paul Weiland

- Theatrical release poster
- Directed by: Paul Weiland
- Screenplay by: Jonathan Reynolds
- Story by: Bill Cosby
- Produced by: Bill Cosby
- Starring: Bill Cosby; Tom Courtenay; Joe Don Baker
- Cinematography: Jan de Bont
- Edited by: Gerry Hambling
- Music by: Elmer Bernstein
- Distributed by: Columbia Pictures
- Release date: December 18, 1987 (U.S.)
- Running time: 85 minutes
- Country: United States
- Language: English
- Budget: $24 million
- Box office: $4.6 million

Leonard Part 6 (also known as Leonard Part VI) is a 1987 American spy parody film. It was directed by Paul Weiland and starred Bill Cosby, who also produced the film and wrote its story. The film also starred Gloria Foster as the villain Medusa Johnson and Joe Don Baker. The film was shot in the San Francisco Bay Area.

The film received universally negative reviews from critics and has often been considered to be one of the worst films ever made. It earned several Golden Raspberry Awards; Cosby himself denounced and disowned it in the press in the weeks leading up to its release. It was also a box-office bomb, earning just over $4.6 million on a $24 million budget.

In spite of the film's negative press and commercial failure, its closing track "Without You" (performed by Peabo Bryson and Regina Belle) became a chart success, peaking at #8 on the Adult Contemporary chart, #14 on the US R&B chart, and #89 on the US Billboard Hot 100 the following year.

== Plot ==
According to the opening sequence of the film, the title refers to the idea that this film is actually the sixth installment of a series of films featuring the adventures of Leonard with parts one through five concealed in the interest of world security. In reality, no Leonard films precede this one.

Leonard Parker is a retired CIA spy who now operates a restaurant. Leonard is called out of retirement by his CIA director Nick Snyderburn to save the world from evil vegetarian Medusa Johnson who brainwashes animals to kill people. He infiltrates Medusa's hideout, the International Tuna factory, fights vegetarians dressed in bird costumes and "horny" bees, and successfully steals her mind control device. However, Medusa kidnaps Leonard's wife Allison and blackmails the CIA into returning the device to her. Leonard then enlists laboratory rabbits to attack other CIA agents in an effort to regain the mind control device.

Leonard again infiltrates Medusa's headquarters to rescue Allison but is captured and tortured by lobsters, but uses their claws to remove their restraints. Freed from the cell, he attacks Medusa's henchmen with "magic meat" he acquired from a Gypsy, while Allison frees the captive animals, and destroys the base using Alka-Seltzer in the animal control chemical vats. He escapes by riding an ostrich across the roof and, despite ostriches being flightless birds, he is flown to the ground by the animal. Leonard and Allison then celebrate their reconciliation in his restaurant.

== Cast ==
- Bill Cosby as Leonard Parker
- Tom Courtenay as Frayn
- Gloria Foster as Medusa Johnson
- Moses Gunn as Giorgio Francozzi
- Pat Colbért as Allison Parker
- Joe Don Baker as Nick Snyderburn
- Victoria Rowell as Joan Parker
- Anna Thomson as Nurse Carvalho
- Grace Zabriskie as Jefferson
- John Hostetter as Adams
- George Kirby as Duchamp
- Obba Babatundé as Drummer
- Larry Gates as Guard
- Leo Rossi as Chef

== Production ==
Bill Cosby says he got the idea for the film from watching a Rambo film. He said he thought to himself "Man, there's got to be a place for a hero who has to deal with a heavy who's got a bigger gun than he has." Cosby described the lead as a "high-tech comic-book character." He said, "I've put stuff in here for the women, I've put stuff in here for the kids."

Asked years later about his work on the film, director Paul Weiland recalled:

It was a terrible mistake. ... When anyone gets into that position (Bill Cosby's position of power in the 1980s), they are surrounded by sycophants and no one tells them the truth. But Cosby just wasn't funny. I couldn't tell him directly. I'd say it feels slow, and he'd say, 'You worry about construction, let me worry about funny.'

== Reception ==
The film received overwhelmingly negative reviews. When the film was released in 1987, even Cosby himself said that he was so disappointed with it that he publicly advised people not to waste their money on it.

Roger Ebert called it "one of the worst movies of the year" and strongly criticized the obvious Coca-Cola product placement in one of the film's close-up scenes, saying that Cosby "ought to be ashamed of himself." Gene Siskel gave the film zero stars out of four, calling it "The year's worst film involving a major star. That's right, it's worse than Ishtar." Variety declared, "Bill Cosby is right to be embarrassed by this dud, but the result really can't have come as a total surprise to him since he wrote the story and produced it." Caryn James of The New York Times wrote: "Mr. Cosby and the director, Paul Weiland, were reportedly at odds while filming Leonard Part 6 ... but there's plenty of blame for them to share. Mr. Weiland's direction, Mr. Cosby's story and Jonathan Reynolds's screenplay seem equally trite." Kevin Thomas of the Los Angeles Times wrote: "Leonard Part 6 is a smug, tedious exercise in self-indulgence ... There's virtually nothing to laugh at in this film, and too much of everything else." Thomas noted that, although Weiland was the director, "clearly Cosby, as star, producer and idea man, is the auteur here." Rita Kempley of The Washington Post stated: "Cosby looks woebegone all movie long. He knows he's out of his element, a comedian of words in a physical role." Robert Garrett wrote in The Boston Globe, "This Christmas turkey is so dreadful that it must be in the same league as Paul Newman's The Silver Chalice for its power to embarrass its star."

As of July 2025, Leonard Part 6 had a 7% rating on Rotten Tomatoes based on 15 reviews with an average rating of 3.5/10.

=== Box office ===
The movie was a box office flop. It grossed only $4,615,255—a mere fraction of its $24 million budget.

=== Accolades ===
The movie won three Golden Raspberry Awards for Worst Picture, Worst Actor (Cosby) and Worst Screenplay (Reynolds and Cosby). It was also nominated for Worst Supporting Actress (Gloria Foster) and Worst Director (Weiland). A few weeks after the 8th Golden Raspberry Awards ceremony, Cosby accepted his three Razzies on Fox's The Late Show. He demanded that the three Razzies he earned be specifically made out of 24 karat (99.99%) gold and Italian marble, which were later paid for by Fox. Cosby later brought the awards with him when he was a guest on The Tonight Show Starring Johnny Carson, happily displaying them and proclaiming, "I swept the awards!" At the 25th Golden Raspberry Awards in 2005, the movie earned a nomination in the Worst "Comedy" of Our First 25 Years category, losing to Gigli.

It was also nominated for Worst Picture at the 1987 Stinkers Bad Movie Awards.

=== Home media ===
VHS and laserdisc 1988 DVD 2005 Bluray 2017

== See also ==
- List of 20th century films considered the worst

Awards
Preceded by Under the Cherry Moon and Howard the Duck	Golden Raspberry Award for Worst Picture; 8th Golden Raspberry Awards	Succeeded by Cocktail
