= Tough Guys Don't Dance (novel) =

1984 novel by Norman Mailer

- Author: Norman Mailer
- Language: English
- Publisher: Random House
- Publication date: 1984
- Publication place: United States
- Media type: Print (hardcover and paperback)
- Pages: 231
- ISBN: 0718124545
- Preceded by: Ancient Evenings
- Followed by: Harlot's Ghost

Tough Guys Don't Dance (1984) is a noir thriller and murder mystery novel by American writer Norman Mailer reminiscent of the works of Dashiell Hammett, Mickey Spillane, and Raymond Chandler. The novel was written in only two months in order to fulfill a contractual obligation. The book was adapted into a film, directed by Mailer, in 1987.

== Plot ==
Set in Provincetown on Cape Cod in Massachusetts, the protagonist is Tim Madden, a former bartender and drug runner, currently struggling to make a living as a writer. After waking one morning with a hangover 24 days after his wife has left him, Madden discovers that he has a new tattoo, the passenger seat of his car is covered in blood, and he has no memory of the previous night. Following a tip from the Acting Chief of Police, Madden travels to his marijuana patch to check on its status and finds, to his surprise, the head of an attractive blonde woman has been deposited in a burrow in the exact place he stashes his cannabis harvest.

With all the evidence for the murder pointing towards him, Madden elects to solve the mystery himself, which brings him into contact with one shady character after another, including corrupt police, criminals, and washed-up boxers. Even a dodgy medium enters the fray as the weary Madden staggers through a succession of dangerous and unforeseen situations.

== Themes ==
=== Sexuality ===
Similar to many of Norman Mailer's writings, Tough Guys Don't Dance contains themes of sexuality throughout. There are explicit homophobic and misogynistic slurs, descriptive details of male and female genitalia, and an overarching exploration of nearly every character's sexual interests and escapades. Tim Madden becomes entangled with his ex-wife, his current wife (whom he met while swinging with another couple which led to his first wife's leaving), a closeted homosexual childhood classmate, his current wife's new lover, a large black man whom Madden simply refers to as 'Mr. Black,' and other characters that are a part of Madden's sexually driven social network. Throughout the story, Mailer's reliance upon sex as a tool is evident, appearing in the form of Madden wanting to 'screw' someone, Jessica Pangborn's "large, well-turned promiscuous breasts," the "part-queer" Bolo Green, and a dependence for the storyline upon a number of nude, obscene photographs of dead women.

=== Detective traditions ===
This book is Norman Mailer's attempt at creating hard-boiled detective fiction. This narrative forms around writer Tim Madden, who, in a hazy fog of remembrance, sets out to piece together what happened to him the night before. On his journey, Madden discovers more death and a serious emphasis coincidences that are too convenient to simply be coincidences. Who can he trust? Unknown new policemen, a spirit inducing medium, his own father, and many faces from Madden's past enter the fray as he must delicately find a balance between who to trust, who beheaded the woman and left her head in his burrow, and how to avoid appearing guilty.

=== Masculinity ===
As seen in this novel, and also present in Mailer's The Time of Her Time, among others, is a major emphasis on masculinity. Mailer's works are notorious for defining masculinity in a myriad of ways. In this book, violence and homosexuality are two major challenges to the protagonist's masculine image, "with two gay suicides, oral/anal graphics, and Madden's confession to his macho Irish father. ("You think I feel like a man most of the time? I don't.")." Also, the title of the book appears in the text about halfway through the story, with a flashback from Tim Madden's days a child learning how to box when his dad told him that "tough guys don't dance." Madden has spent the rest of his life figuring out how not to dance in order to prove his masculinity, until it is challenged to its very core in the book.

== Reception ==
Tough Guys Don't Dance received mixed reviews upon release. Of his positive reviews, coming from The Wall Street Journal and the St. Petersburg Times, Christopher Ricks, writing for the London Review of Books, states that "Mailer can still write like an angel, fallen and flaming." He also says, "Mailer is a master of small surprises...his style is largely to be trusted." Ricks does, however, acknowledge the deprecation of Mailer's writings by many American reviewers, signaling a universal understanding of the novel's mixed opinions.

The New York Times, among others such as The Boston Globe, published a number of negative reviews. Denis Donoghue writes, "But what I mostly feel, reading Tough Guys Don't Dance, is the wretched inadequacy of the novel to the intention it clearly enough avows." Additionally, Christopher Lehmann-Haupt, in his segment "The Books of the Times" writes, "On top of the faults I've already hinted at - its implausibility and strutting out of too familiar stratagems and obsessions - one could knock it for being rushed, repetitious, all too nearly an unintended parody of itself."

The novel was also negatively reviewed by Kirkus Reviews, which calls it a "thin, disappointing potpourri overall—seemingly made up as it goes along, with about equal portions of inspiration and self-indulgence." The review continues on to say that the novel is purely Norman Mailer in its themes and language, which tends to divide readers into either supporters or critics with little room left in the middle.

== Film adaptation ==
Mailer adapted his novel into a movie in 1987, and also acted as the film's director. The resulting film, starring Ryan O'Neal and Isabella Rossellini, was not a critical or commercial success. The movie currently maintains a 38% on Rotten Tomatoes and a 5.0 on IMDb. Vincent Canby of the New York Times wrote, "Tough Guys Don't Dance is not the high point of the Mailer career, but it's a small, entertaining part of it." Additionally, Hal Hinson of the Washington Post wrote, "'Tough Guys' never finds its footing, though, or a workable, consistent style. The movie has its pleasures; I laughed at a lot of it, but I've rarely found it harder to determine whether the film's effects were the result of the artist's designs or his ineptitude." The movie, however, did have a few supporters in spite of its lackluster showing, yielding less than a fifth of its budget in its box office earnings. Jonathan Rosenbaum of the Chicago Reader, said "Norman Mailer's best film, adapted from his worst novel, shows a surprising amount of cinematic savvy and style."
