= Who's That Girl (1987 film) =

1987 film by James Foley

- Theatrical release poster
- Directed by: James Foley
- Screenplay by: Andrew Smith; Ken Finkleman
- Story by: Andrew Smith
- Produced by: Rosilyn Heller; Bernard Williams
- Starring: Madonna; Griffin Dunne; Haviland Morris; John McMartin; Sir John Mills
- Cinematography: Jan de Bont
- Edited by: Pembroke J. Herring
- Music by: Stephen Bray
- Production company: Guber-Peters Company
- Distributed by: Warner Bros.
- Release date: August 7, 1987
- Running time: 94 minutes
- Country: United States
- Language: English
- Budget: $17–20 million
- Box office: $19 million

Who's That Girl is a 1987 American screwball comedy film directed by James Foley, and written by Andrew Smith and Ken Finkleman. It stars Madonna and Griffin Dunne, and depicts the story of Nikki Finn, a street-smart girl who is falsely accused of murdering her boyfriend Johnny and is sent to jail. After release, she meets Loudon Trott, who is supposed to make sure she gets on her bus back to Philadelphia, and convinces him to help her catch those responsible for her confinement. While searching for an embezzler, they fall in love with each other.

After her 1986 film Shanghai Surprise failed, Madonna decided to sign on to another comedy, titled Slammer, later renamed Who's That Girl. However, she had to convince both Warner Bros. and the film's producers that she was ready. Madonna enlisted her friend Foley to direct. Shooting began in New York in October 1986, and continued until March 1987. Production was halted during December due to snowfall. Madonna utilized the time to work on her next tour and the film's soundtrack.

The film was released on August 7, 1987, and was a box-office bomb, grossing $2.5 million in its first week, with its final domestic total being about $7.3 million on a budget between $17–20 million. Critics were highly dissatisfied with the film, and Foley's direction. However, the accompanying music tour went on to be a critical and commercial success, grossing a total of US$25 million, and playing in front of audiences totaling 1.5 million people. The soundtrack also enjoyed commercial success, selling over six million copies worldwide, in addition to the title track becoming Madonna's sixth number one single on the US Billboard Hot 100 record chart.

== Plot ==
Nikki Finn is a carefree young woman who usually wears a leather jacket and skirt, sports fire-red lips and a platinum bubble cut, and speaks in a high-pitched voice; she is also resourceful and intelligent. One day her boyfriend Johnny sees two men stealing money out of a trust fund and takes a picture of this theft. He puts the pictures in a safe deposit box and gives Nikki the key for safekeeping. The thieves catch and murder Johnny and frame Nikki by dumping his body into the trunk of her car, and she is sentenced to seven years in prison.

Four years later, tax attorney Loudon Trott is marrying Wendy, the daughter of one of the richest men in New York, Simon Worthington. Wendy is a selfish woman who is more consumed in her wedding plans than in her fiancé's well-being. Loudon, on the other hand, has many duties entrusted to him by his boss—and future father-in-law—Mr. Worthington: First he must pick up a cougar for exotic-animal activist Montgomery Bell, then he must pick up Nikki (who has been put on parole) and lastly he must make sure she catches the next bus to her home town, Philadelphia.

Meanwhile, Nikki is determined to catch the actual thieves and expose the truth. After meeting Loudon, Nikki cons him into taking her shopping. After they take a Rolls-Royce into Harlem to buy a gun—and are nearly arrested during a police raid—she tells Loudon her story; believing she is innocent, he decides to help her. She is also on the run from a pimp named Raoul and his lackey Benny, the ones who killed Johnny. Only after dangling off a Cadillac limousine smashed through the top floor of a parking garage does he tell her the bank and the box number (6111) of her slain boyfriend.

Afterward, Nikki vanishes with the cougar, whom she names Murray. Later that night, Loudon visits Mr. Bell to apologize for losing the animal, then finds that Nikki had delivered Murray and was waiting for Loudon at Mr. Bell's penthouse apartment; he has created a Brazilian rainforest filled with animals on top of his roof. There Nikki and Loudon—who have become close—express love for each other; Murray also finds a mate. Loudon delivers Nikki to the bus station the next morning, but Nikki brokenheartedly realizes that she must return to Philadelphia, leaving Loudon, who is about to get married. On the bus she opens an envelope from the security box and finds the photographs that prove that Mr. Worthington is an embezzler and he was the mastermind behind the theft. Nikki gate-crashes the wedding, gets Mr. Worthington arrested, and proclaims her love for Loudon. Nikki and Loudon ride off into the sunset on a bus to Philadelphia, with Murray and his partner chasing after them.

== Cast ==
- Madonna as Nikki Finn
- Griffin Dunne as Loudon Trott
- Haviland Morris as Wendy Worthington
- John McMartin as Simon Worthington
- Bibi Besch as Ms. Worthington
- John Mills as Montgomery Bell
- Robert Swan as Detective Bellson
- Drew Pillsbury as Detective Doyle
- Coati Mundi as Raoul
- Dennis Burkley as Benny
- Karen Dianne Baldwin as Heather
- Ron Taylor as 1st Dock Worker
- Carmen Filpi as Street Bum #1
- Stanley Tucci as 2nd Dock Worker
- Mike Starr as Shipping Co-Worker
- Albert Popwell as Parole Chairman

== Production ==
=== Development ===
I was young, I was twenty-eight. So, being given the opportunity to work on a Warner Bros. film with a huge star was attractive to me for all the wrong reasons. Everyone has a bit of Hollywood lust in them. Warner Bros. approached me because they knew I knew Madonna and she had asked for me, and was convinced to do it. At Close Range was a dark film, and going towards comedy was totally the wrong direction. But I didn't care.

— Director James Foley talking about why he chose to direct Who's That Girl

Madonna's 1986 studio album True Blue was a critical and commercial success, spawning five top-five Billboard Hot 100 singles, and selling over eight million copies worldwide, by the year-end. However, her film career was not as successful as she had hoped it would be. Following the commercially successful Desperately Seeking Susan, her 1986 film Shanghai Surprise—where she starred with her then husband Sean Penn—was a critical and box-office failure, prompting Madonna to comment that she "struggled to come to terms with her character in Shanghai Surprise, because the innocence and repressed personality I was required to portray was so at variance with my own character." Continuing to struggle with her film career, Madonna was unsure of her ability to choose a good script, and film producers were less sure about backing her up.

Madonna felt that comedy was more of her repertoire, and proceeded to sign a comedy film titled Slammer, written by Andrew Smith and Ken Finkleman. She wanted to play the part of a street smart girl called Nikki Finn, who was jailed for a crime she did not commit. However, in light of the bad publicity surrounding her and Penn, and of the very public failure of Shanghai Surprise, Madonna had to persuade producers Rosilyn Heller and Bernard Williams, as well as Warner Bros., that she was up for the part. In addition, she wanted friend James Foley to direct the film. Foley had been Penn's best man at his marriage to Madonna, and had directed the music videos of Madonna's singles "Live to Tell" (1986) and "Papa Don't Preach" (1986). He was ecstatic at having the opportunity to make a major feature film, as previously he had only directed the small-budgeted film At Close Range, starring Penn. As author Andrew Morton pointed out in his biography on Madonna, "the combination of a dubiously talented movie star and a first-time movie director hardly guaranteed a box-office hit, but the film received the go-ahead from Warner, who wanted to encache more on Madonna's success." Madonna plowed gamely on, saying: "All Warner's executives were real positive about the project. It was a process—with the writers—of honing the script, making it better."

=== Casting ===
Casting for the film began as soon as Madonna had signed up for it. Griffin Dunne was signed to play the part of Loudon Trott, a lawyer whose job was to help Nikki get on a bus, after she was released. Initially, Madonna had thought of asking Penn to play the part of Detective Bellson, but Penn was serving a 60-day jail term, having violated the probation he received in 1986, for assaulting a friend of Madonna. The part went to Robert Swan, followed by the signing of John McMartin, Haviland Morris and Bibi Besch as Trott's father-in-law Simon, fiancée Wendy, and mother-in-law Mrs. Worthington respectively. Madonna commented that she had a lot in common with the character Nikki. "She's courageous and sweet and funny and misunderstood. But she clears her name in the last, and that's always good to do. I'm continuously doing that with the public. I liked Nikki's tough side and her sweet side. The toughness is only a mask for the vulnerability she feels inside." Madonna was also offered the lead role Nadia Gates in the Blake Edwards comedy film Blind Date opposite to Bruce Willis, but she refused it in favor of Slammer. She said, "The thing I had planned to do after Shanghai Surprise was Blind Date at Tri-Star. I was supposed to have the approval of the director and the leading man, but they didn't tell me they'd already hired Bruce Willis. That... just didn't work out. But I was really excited about doing a real physical, screwball comedy, so when Jamie brought this up, it was like my reward." Coati Mundi, member of Kid Creole and the Coconuts and Madonna's long-time friend, joined the cast to play the role of Raoul, Nikki's enemy. Costume designer Deborah Scott was signed to create the wardrobe for the film. Madonna, who visualized the character of Nikki as a dizzy screwball blonde, started watching screwball comedies, especially the work of actors like Cary Grant, Clark Gable, Carole Lombard and Judy Holliday. She asked Scott to create comical rah-rah and ballet tutu skirts for the character, with fishnet tights and loud make-up. Scott also designed a glamorous Marilyn Monroe-esque dress for the love scene between Nikki and Loudon.

=== Filming ===
Filming began in New York in July 1986. Madonna would ask for five minutes to study the script for the scene they were filming. For example, before a scene in which she needed to appear out of breath, she did a series of push-ups before going on set. Dunne observed that "[Madonna] likes her first take best. I think my best is around fourth. She always says, 'You got it, you got it,' and she was driving me crazy just like her character would. We had to make a compromise as to which take is the best." Madonna wanted Foley to give her proper direction on set, but he preferred her to be her real self, rather than the persona in her music videos. Regarding her acting abilities, Foley stressed the fact that Madonna was very uptight and into every detail, determined to have the correct portrayal. "That's probably why it wasn't so good. In Desperately Seeking Susan, when she didn't know what she was doing, she was being natural and at her best."

As December arrived, production was halted for a few days due to snowfall in New York City. Madonna decided to utilize the time by working on the film's soundtrack and her next concert tour. While recording the title track, Madonna decided to change the film's name from Slammer to Who's That Girl as she felt it to be a better title. Filming commenced in January 1987, where the scene involving a cougar was shot. During the second take, the cougar accidentally escaped from the cage, resulting in filming being paused for a few hours. By February 1987, Madonna's scenes were already shot although she proceeded to linger on the set to watch Foley and his team work. Foley described her being around the set and not acting as a "pain-in-the-ass", since she "won't skimp especially on cost and she should know that Warner had a tight schedule and constraints on the budget. They still did not trust Madonna when it came to acting. Hell they even gave a greater percentage of the budget to the soundtrack." Filming ended in March 1987, with post-production continuing till July 1987. During the development of the opening credits, Madonna asked Foley if they could have a cartoon figure of her character introducing the film credits. Foley liked the idea, and Warner enlisted Broadcast Arts to create the cartoon. The sequence was animation directed by Richard Machin, produced by Peter Rosenthal, animated by Glen Claybrook, John Canemaker, Doug Frankel, Dan Haskett, Norma Rivera-Klingler, April March, Bob McKnight, Edward Rivera and Bob Scott, with concept art and character designs by Daniel Melgarejo, assisted by Neil Martinson; and edited by James Romaine and Conni X.

=== Music and soundtrack ===
The soundtrack from the film was released on July 21, 1987, by Sire Records, and contains four songs by Madonna, and others by her label mates Scritti Politti, Duncan Faure, Club Nouveau, Coati Mundi and Michael Davidson. It is considered a Madonna album by Warner Bros. Records since almost half of the songs on the album are sung by her. Madonna began working on the soundtrack in December 1986, and contacted Patrick Leonard and Stephen Bray, both producers of her third studio album True Blue (1986). She needed uptempo and downtempo songs for the soundtrack. The uptempo song, composed by Leonard, ended up being the title track for the film; together, Madonna and Leonard also developed the downtempo ballad "The Look of Love". Two more songs were composed for the film with Bray, the first being the dancey tune "Causing a Commotion", and the other being "Can't Stop", a track inspired by Sixties Motown and the group Martha and the Vandellas.

After its release, the Who's That Girl soundtrack received mostly negative reviews from critics, who called it plain and incomplete, although citing the title track and "The Look of Love" as its highlights. The soundtrack was a commercial success, reaching the top ten of the album charts of the United States, Austria, Canada, France, Italy, New Zealand, Sweden and the United Kingdom, while topping the charts of Germany, and Billboard's European Album chart. Worldwide, the album went on to sell six million copies. Three of the Madonna tracks were released as singles. The title track became her sixth number one single on the Billboard Hot 100, making her the first artist to accumulate six number-one singles in the 1980s, and the first female performer to get that many number-ones as a solo act. "Causing a Commotion" was the second single, and it reached number two on the Hot 100, and the top ten of the charts of other nations. "The Look of Love" was a European market-only release, reaching the top ten in United Kingdom singles chart. Another track, "Turn It Up" was a promotional release in the United States, reaching the number 15 on the dance charts.

== Release and promotion ==
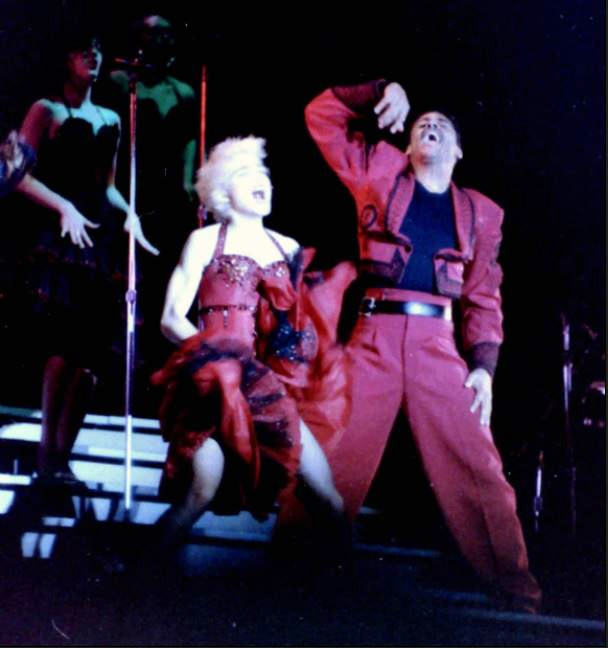
Madonna performing the film's title track during the Who's That Girl World Tour.

The film was released on August 7, 1987, in the United States to 944 theatres. Warner Bros. did not arrange for an advance screening because it believed that Madonna's appeal would draw moviegoers to come to the film. A pre-release celebration was held on August 6, 1987, at Times Square in New York, where Madonna arrived to promote the film. A crowd of almost 10,000 people assembled to watch Madonna. As an introduction to the day, the radio jockeys from New York's WHTZ radio station played Madonna's popular songs in the Square atop a platform created for the event. The police closed off 43rd and 44th streets, but allowed the traffic to pass through Broadway and Seventh Avenue of Manhattan. Although she was late by about an hour, the crowd number continued increasing. Joseph A. Cincotti from The New York Times noted that most of the crowd were in their late teenage years and early 20s. Some held up signs and photographs but he noticed the Madonna wannabes were absent, the adolescent girls who had imitated Madonna's early lace-and-leather look. This was a result of Madonna's more mature image from True Blue.

To further promote the film, Madonna embarked on the 1987 Who's That Girl World Tour. It was Madonna's first world tour, reaching Asia, North America and Europe. Musically and technically superior to her previous Virgin Tour, the Who's That Girl tour incorporated multimedia components to make the show more appealing. Madonna trained herself physically with aerobics, jogging and weight-lifting to cope with the choreography and the dance routines. The stage was bigger than her previous tour, flanked with four video screens, multimedia projectors and a flight of stairs in the middle. Leonard became the music director and encouraged Madonna to go with the idea of rearranging her older songs and presenting them in a new format. Madonna named the tour as Who's That Girl, when during rehearsals one-day she looked at a gigantic image of herself, projected on a screen on the stage and mused about how much she has changed and "who was that girl on the screen?". The show consisted of seven costume changes, with song-and-dance routines, theatrics, addressing social causes—during "Papa Don't Preach"—as well as an encore, consisting of the title song "Who's That Girl" and "Holiday". The tour was critically appreciated, and critics commented on the extravagant nature of the concert and complimented Madonna for her dancing, costume changes and dynamic pacing. Who's That Girl was a commercial success, grossing in total of US$25 million by playing in front of 1.5 million audience members. According to Performance magazine, it was the second top selling female concert tour of 1987, behind Tina Turner's Break Every Rule Tour.

=== Critical response ===
Who's That Girl is no Something Wild. It isn't even a real throwback to the screwball comedies of the 1930s, although it evokes the 1938 Katharine Hepburn-Cary Grant Bringing Up Baby by allotting a major role to a cougar (Hepburn had a leopard) that extricates [Madonna, Griffin] from trouble every time she whistles... In an era where packaging and art are often indistinguishable, Madonna is in her element. She's a performer and a strong personality... but she's not an actress. She doesn't know how to play anyone who's not Madonna.

— Jay Carr from The Boston Globe reviewing the film.

Who's That Girl received generally negative reviews from critics. As of May 2022, the film had a rating of 33% on review aggregator website Rotten Tomatoes from 21 reviews. Metacritic, which uses a weighted average, assigned the film a score of 27 out of 100, based on 9 critics, indicating "generally unfavorable" reviews. Vincent Canby of The New York Times noted that Madonna, left to her own devices and her own canny pace, is a very engaging comedian. "When Madonna's no-nonsense pragmatism isn't being twisted into poses of lovable eccentricity, the actress is sexy and funny and never for a minute sentimental. At times she looks amazingly like Marilyn Monroe, but the personality is her own, more resilient and more knowing. As the WASP-y sleeping prince, Mr. Dunne gives the most stylishly comic performance of a career that's been largely underrated by the public. Though he seems to be Madonna's foil, he provides the movie with its backbone, even in its most ludicrous moments. He may well be one of the most truly sophisticated straight men in the business today." However, he ended the review by saying that the film was short on outright guffaws.

Hal Hinson of The Washington Post gave the film a mixed review, commenting that "you may not feel as if you've seen a movie. You may not quite know what you've seen" and that although he laughed too much, the film "is outrageously inept, but not in a routine manner". Hinson also criticized the work of Foley, noting that he "doesn't have the skill to sustain a cartoon style." Philip Wuntch of The Dallas Morning News commented that the film is a deft and daffy comedy performance; Madonna is great with the one-liners. ... As a movie star, Madonna may be an acquired taste. But one thing is certain: acquiring this particular taste is going to be an enjoyable experience." Jay Boyar of the Orlando Sentinel gave a negative review saying, "Luckily for her, Madonna can sing, and use it to save herself from this disgrace of a movie."

Jamie Waylett of The Advocate was more critical, saying "Madonna delivers the worst performance in recent memory as the heroine of an attempt at screwball comedy. Watching her try to look like Marilyn Monroe and sound like Betty Boop, the final effect being like Jerry Lewis though, is a sure sign that this film was a disaster in the making. At the same time, it seems inconceivable that anyone would sit down and plan something so dreadful." Carole Kass of the Richmond Times-Dispatch felt that since "Madonna is the idol of teen-agers. If they imitate her hair and her makeup, these 'wanna-bes' who want to be like Madonna and dress like Madonna may be cute. But, as a popular personality, Madonna has a responsibility to her fans. And shoplifting is something not to promote. Nor is smoking." Dan Dinicola of The Schenectady Gazette felt that "Who's That Girl is not simply an awful film, it is positively unbearable. It's a movie without a head or a brain, a picture of such crass stupidity that it can't even make you angry. Instead it numbs you to death with its moronic platitudes, its pretensions to comedy. ... It's a vanity project which is so amateurly produced and conceived that it makes you want to cringe in shame. ... Madonna is no more than a novelty item." Johanna Steinmetz of the Chicago Tribune complimented Dunne's acting and said: "Fortunately the film has Griffin Dunne. Dunne, working in a domain once ruled by Cary Grant, manages to be stuffy, naive and vulnerable but never undignified as Loudon Trott, the New York lawyer." Jean Rosenbluth of Rolling Stone was harsh about the film, saying "The question posed by the film's title was Who's That Girl? The answer provided by the box-office receipts was, alas, 'The same one who appeared in Shanghai Surprise and bored us to death'."

The picture was nominated for five Golden Raspberry Award at the 8th Golden Raspberry Awards, including Worst Picture, Worst Director (Foley), Worst Original Song ("El Coco Loco" by Coati Mundi) and Worst Screenplay, with Madonna winning Worst Actress. It was also nominated for Worst Picture at the 1987 Stinkers Bad Movie Awards.

=== Box office ===
The film was not successful at the US box office. It was released in 944 theatres, with an extra 66 being added later. In its opening weekend, the film grossed $2.5 million ($7.08 million in 2025 dollars), becoming the tenth highest-grossing film of that week in the United States. The next week it had a 60% decline in sales. The film grossed a total of $7.3 million ($20.69 million in 2025 dollars) in the United States and Canada. By November 30, 1987, it had grossed $12.3 million internationally, for a worldwide gross in excess of $19 million. Morton noted that although "Madonna's comic talent was acknowledged, cinemagoers in the United States stayed away in droves." The film's comparatively better faring at international territories prompted Madonna to defend that her ideas were better accepted in Europe and Japan, rather than her home country. She added, "I think the movie did badly in America because I upstaged it with my tour. People were confused about the connection between the record, the tour and the movie because they all had the same title. I also think there are people who don't want me to do well in both fields. I had to really fight to get any respect from the music business and now I guess there are some people who feel that I ought to be grateful for that respect and stick to music."

Foley accepted the failure of the film wishing he could rewrite the script. He remembered when he met Madonna at a hotel lobby. "She just looked to me once and said, 'So it's a flop right?' That's the only time she ever mentioned the film. Even Sean also never mentioned it in front of her." In another article in The New York Times, Vincent Canby noted that Madonna's real personality of a "knowing, shrewd, pragmatic young woman" failed to get portrayed in the film, becoming a possible cause of its failure. Author Georges Claude Guilbert believed that the comical personality of Madonna was also not accepted by the public. Warner Bros. decided to release the film in home media in VHS on November 11, 1987.

== See also ==
- List of American films of 1987

== Book sources ==
- Bego, Mark (2000). Madonna: Blonde Ambition. Cooper Square Press. ISBN 978-0-8154-1051-5.
- Bronson, Fred (2003). The Billboard Book of Number One Hits. Billboard books. ISBN 0-8230-7677-6.
- Clerk, Carol (2002). Madonnastyle. Omnibus Press. ISBN 0-7119-8874-9.
- Feldman, Christopher (2000). Billboard Book of Number Two Singles. Watson-Guptill. ISBN 0-8230-7695-4.
- Guilbert, Georges-Claude (2002). Madonna As Postmodern Myth. McFarland. ISBN 0-7864-1408-1.
- Metz, Allen; Benson, Carol (1999). The Madonna Companion: Two Decades of Commentary. Music Sales Group. ISBN 0-8256-7194-9.
- Michael, Mick St. (2004). Madonna 'Talking': Madonna in Her Own Words. Omnibus Press. ISBN 1-84449-418-7.
- Morton, Andrew (2002). Madonna. Macmillan Publishers. ISBN 0-312-98310-7.
- O'Brien, Lucy (2007). Madonna: Like an Icon. Bantam Press. ISBN 978-0-593-05547-2.
- Rooksby, Rikky (2004). The Complete Guide to the Music of Madonna. Omnibus Press. ISBN 0-7119-9883-3.
- Rosen, Craig (1996). The Billboard Book of Number One Albums. Billboard books. ISBN 978-0-8230-7586-7.
- Strong, Martin Charles (2003). The Great Indie Discography. Canongate Books. ISBN 1-84195-335-0.
- Taraborrelli, Randy J. (2002). Madonna: An Intimate Biography. Simon & Schuster. ISBN 978-1-4165-8346-2.
- Voller, Debbi (1999). Madonna: The Style Book. Omnibus Press. ISBN 0-7119-7511-6.
