= The Garbage Pail Kids Movie =

1987 film by Rod Amateau

- Theatrical release poster
- Directed by: Rod Amateau
- Written by: Rod Amateau; Melinda Palmer
- Based on: Garbage Pail Kids by John Pound
- Produced by: Rod Amateau
- Starring: Anthony Newley; Mackenzie Astin; Katie Barberi
- Cinematography: Harvey Genkins
- Edited by: Leon Carrere; M. Edward Salier
- Music by: Michael Lloyd
- Production companies: Atlantic Entertainment Group; Topps Chewing Gum
- Distributed by: Atlantic Releasing Corporation
- Release date: August 21, 1987
- Running time: 97 minutes
- Country: United States
- Language: English
- Budget: $1 million
- Box office: $1.6 million

The Garbage Pail Kids Movie is a 1987 American adventure comedy film serving as a film adaptation of the children's trading-cards series of the same name produced, directed and co-written by Rod Amateau. It was the last film to be directed by Amateau before his retirement in 1989.

The cards, which began as a parody of the popular Cabbage Patch Kids dolls, featured characters with gross habits or abnormalities, or who suffer a terrible fate. The film depicts seven of the Garbage Pail Kids (played by dwarf actors in animatronic costumes) interacting with society and befriending Dodger, a regular boy.

The Garbage Pail Kids Movie received overwhelmingly negative reviews. It was nominated for three Golden Raspberry Awards, including the Golden Raspberry Award for Worst New Star.

== Plot ==
A garbage-can spaceship is seen flying near Earth, and is then shown inside an antique shop owned by Captain Manzini. A boy named Dodger is being assaulted by four older teenage bullies in a park. Juice, the leader, steals Dodger's money and drops him in a puddle. Dodger goes to Manzini's antique shop, where he works. Manzini takes Dodger's clothes and cleans them while warning him to stay away from the garbage can.

Later, Dodger sees Tangerine, Juice's girlfriend, and he tries to persuade her to buy something from the shop. Dodger is attracted to Tangerine and covertly smells her hair while she is distracted. The other bullies enter the shop and attempt to bully Dodger again, but he manages to outwit them. However, during the tussle, the garbage can is knocked over and a green ooze spills out. The bullies then bring Dodger into a sewer, handcuff him to a rail and open a pipe, pouring sewage onto him. Dodger is then saved by little mysterious people named the Garbage Pail Kids.

Manzini returns and is upset that the Garbage Pail Kids have been released from their can, but he introduces Dodger to each of them: Greaser Greg, a leather jacket-wearing greaser with a violent attitude; Messy Tessie, a girl with a constantly runny nose; Windy Winston, a boy who wears a Hawaiian shirt and often farts violently; Valerie Vomit, a girl who throws up on command; Foul Phil, a whining hungry baby with halitosis who constantly asks characters if they are his "mommy" or "daddy"; Nat Nerd, an obese acne-riddled boy who dresses up like a superhero and wets his pants frequently; and Ali Gator, the group's leader, an anthropomorphic half-person/half-alligator with an appetite for human toes. Manzini explains that the kids are forbidden from appearing in public because they will be attacked by the "normies" (normal people), and that he cannot force the kids to return to the garbage can without magic.

The next day, Dodger accompanies Tangerine to a nightclub where she sells clothes that she has designed. Dodger behaves awkwardly when Tangerine removes her shirt to sell it. Dodger then hides when Juice appears. Meanwhile, the kids steal a Pepsi truck, flatten Juice's car with it and then start a campfire in an alley with stolen food. The next morning, the Garbage Pail Kids recover from food-induced hangovers and present Dodger with a jacket that they sewed. The jacket impresses Tangerine, and she asks Dodger to acquire more clothes so that she can sell them. Upon Dodger's request, the kids increase their output after stealing a sewing machine from a non-union sweatshop, but then become bored and venture out in public in disguise. They visit a theater playing Three Stooges shorts and behave obnoxiously. Ali and Winston go to the toughest bar in the world and become embroiled in a fight with bikers, who are soon won over by the kids' heroics, and they all celebrate with beer. Meanwhile, Tangerine sells the clothes and begins to prepare for a fashion show based on them. She meets the kids and, although repulsed by them, realizes that she can take advantage of their designs.

On the night of the fashion show, Tangerine locks the kids in the basement of the antique shop to prevent their escape, and soon they are captured by Juice and his gang, who bring them to the State Home for the Ugly, a prison where people too ugly for society are brought and executed. Manzini, Dodger and the bikers help the kids and the other prisoners escape and head to the fashion show. The kids trash the fashion show and tear the clothes from the models while Dodger defeats Juice. Later that night, Tangerine apologizes to Dodger and asks to be his friend, but Dodger rejects her, saying that he does not think that she is pretty anymore. Captain Manzini tries to play the Garbage Pail Kids' song in reverse in order to coax them back into the garbage can, but the kids sneak out and ride away on stolen ATVs to cause more havoc.

== Cast ==
- Anthony Newley as Captain Manzini
- Mackenzie Astin as Dodger
- Katie Barberi as Tangerine
- Ron MacLachlan as Juice
- J.P. Amateau as Wally
- Marjory Graue as Blythe
- John Herman Shaner as Police Officer
- Leo Gordon as Prison Guard
- Patty Lloyd as Foster Mother
- John Cade as Bartender
- Lynn Cartwright as Fashion Show Host

=== The Garbage Pail Kids ===
- Phil Fondacaro as Greaser Greg
  - Jim Cummings as Greaser Greg (voice)
- Debbie Lee Carrington as Valerie Vomit
- Kevin Thompson as Ali Gator
- Robert Bell as Foul Phil
  - Chloe Amateau as Foul Phil (voice)
- Larry Green as Nat Nerd
  - Jim Cummings as Nat Nerd (voice)
- Arturo Gil as Windy Winston
- Sue Rossitto as Messy Tessie
  - Teri Benaron as Messy Tessie (voice)

== Production ==
Originally the film was conceived as a horror movie. Which was pitched by the final film’s design supervisor, John Carl Buechler. It’s not known how far this version went in development.

The earliest known script of the film was the revised second draft written by Melinda Palmer and Rod Amateau, on February 27th, 1987. At this point the movie was intended as a family film.

In April 1987, it was announced that Atlantic Entertainment Group had acquired the license for the Garbage Pail Kids from Topps to be adapted as a feature film. The trading-card series had been a great success, selling more than a billion cards and launching themed merchandise. John Astin tried to convince his son, Mackenzie, to not star in the film as he felt it would be a bad idea. Shooting began in April of that year and was completed by June, with the quick turnaround time credited to the film's use of the Ediflex electronic editing system, which had been more commonly utilized for television shows and allowed the production to operate with a smaller crew and almost no film-lab services.

== Release ==
The Garbage Pail Kids Movie was theatrically released on August 21, 1987.

== Reception and legacy ==
The film's depiction of the Garbage Pail Kids in costumes received criticism.

The film holds a 0% approval rating and an average score of 2.1/10 on Rotten Tomatoes, based on 16 reviews. Metacritic gives the film a score of 1 out of 100, the lowest on the website tied with nine other movies, based on reviews from seven critics, indicating "overwhelming dislike". Juan Carlos Coto, writing for the Fort Lauderdale Sun-Sentinel, called the film "one of the worst ever made".

Caryn James of The New York Times called the film "too repulsive for children or adults of any age", while Akron Beacon Journal film critic Bill O'Connor criticized the costumes in the film as well as its message, writing that it merely pays "lip service" to the message that "our insistence on physical beauty, and a narrowly defined 'beauty' at that, limits our understanding, cuts us off from real human beauty."

Internet personality Doug Walker, best known for the series Nostalgia Critic, stated in a 2012 video that it was not only the worst film he had ever reviewed for Nostalgia Critic, but the worst movie he had ever seen overall, deeming that the film undermined its own message; he further thanked his mother from forbidding him from seeing it as a child. In 2025, Walker released an updated list of the worst films he had reviewed, with The Garbage Pail Kids Movie once again taking the top spot.

Atlantic Releasing Corporation's head of marketing, Martin Rabinovich, attributed the negative reviews and poor box-office performance to marketing difficulties, saying that while the film was targeted toward children, it was not necessarily a family film.

=== Accolades ===
Date	Award	Category	Recipients	Result	Ref.
1988	Stinkers Bad Movie Awards	Worst Picture	The Garbage Pail Kids Movie	Nominated	
April 10, 1988	Golden Raspberry Awards	Worst New Star	The Garbage Pail Kids (Ali Gator, Greaser Greg, Nat Nerd, Foul Phil, Messy Tessie, Valerie Vomit and Windy Winston)	Nominated	
April 10, 1988	Golden Raspberry Awards	Worst Original Song	"You Can Be a Garbage Pail Kid", by Michael Lloyd	Nominated	
April 10, 1988	Golden Raspberry Awards	Worst Visual Effects	The Garbage Pail Kids Movie	Nominated	

== Home media ==
The film was released on DVD in July 2005 by MGM and on Blu-ray by Shout! Factory on December 8, 2015 and by Vinegar Syndrome in November 2025 (the latter from a 4K Scan on the original 35mm camera negative).

== Cancelled reboot ==
In 2012, it was reported that Michael Eisner's The Tornante Company had plans to finance and produce the development of a feature film based on Garbage Pail Kids, as Eisner had recently purchased the Topps trading-card company in 2007.

== See also ==
- List of 20th century films considered the worst
- List of films with a 0% rating on Rotten Tomatoes
- Garbage Pail Kids (TV series, 1987)
