= From the Hip (film) =

1987 film by Bob Clark

- Directed by: Bob Clark
- Written by: Bob Clark; David E. Kelley
- Produced by: Bob Clark; René Dupont
- Starring: Judd Nelson; Elizabeth Perkins; John Hurt; Ray Walston; Darren McGavin
- Cinematography: Dante Spinotti
- Edited by: Stan Cole
- Music by: Paul Zaza
- Distributed by: De Laurentiis Entertainment Group
- Release date: February 6, 1987
- Running time: 111 minutes
- Country: United States
- Language: English
- Budget: $9 million or $7.5 million
- Box office: $9,518,342

From the Hip is a 1987 American courtroom comedy-drama film directed by Bob Clark from a screenplay by Clark and David E. Kelley. The film stars Judd Nelson, Elizabeth Perkins, John Hurt, Ray Walston, and Darren McGavin.

In the film, Robert "Stormy" Weathers, a recent graduate of law school manipulates his superiors into allowing him to represent banker Raymond Torkenson in his trial. He intentionally turns the case into a media frenzy, and then wins the trial by conspiring with opposing lawyer Matt Cowens. Having won fame and a promotion, Weathers next becomes the lead defense counsel in a murder trial. When he realizes that his client Douglas Benoit is actually guilty, he is more interested in making the man pay for his crime than in advancing his own career.

== Plot ==
Fresh out of law school, Robin "Stormy" Weathers cannot stand the tedium of case filing and research. Desperately wanting to "practice law" and go to trial, one morning he intentionally withholds the fact that a trial is scheduled to begin that very afternoon to compel his superiors to let him try the case because he is the only one familiar with the facts of the case. During his meeting with client Raymond Torkenson, the president of a bank who intentionally struck banker Phil Ames, Torkenson declares the "simple assault case" to be a no-winner (explaining that he hits people all the time), but wants the one-day trial to somehow be stretched to three days to run up the other banker's legal fees.

Weathers prolongs the case by creating a 1st Amendment constitutional challenge as to the admissibility of the word "asshole", escalating the case into a media frenzy. The senior partners of the law firm are embarrassed by Weathers' behavior and unconventional methods and try to fire him. Torkenson retaliates on Weathers' behalf by threatening to take the bank's business elsewhere. Weathers appears to be crafty and intuitive, but in reality, had conspired with the other attorney Matt Cowens, a friend of his, to stage a brilliant legal engagement to make themselves look good. Weathers wins the trial and in doing so attracts a plethora of new clients to the firm which skyrockets him to be a junior partner.

In an act of unfair retaliation, Weathers is assigned to be lead defense counsel in a first-degree murder case involving university professor Douglas Benoit who is almost certainly guilty of bludgeoning prostitute Liza Williams to death with the claw of a hammer. Benoit wanted Weathers because he saw him in the previous case. Weathers takes the case and his loud and odd courtroom behavior soon amazes the judge, the spectators and sometimes embarrasses his girlfriend Jo Ann. Determined to impress his employers by winning a verdict of not guilty, no matter what, his courtroom antics soon visibly gain even the jury's favor and raise the likelihood of acquittal.

Weathers unsuccessfully tries to get Benoit to accept a plea-bargain to manslaughter charges and soon discovers that Benoit is guilty: in a thinly veiled confession used to taunt his own defense attorney, Benoit vividly describes to him the "clarity of mind" it takes for a man to be able to split someone's skull open with the claw of a hammer... while the person remains alive. Weathers becomes conflicted between his sense of duty and ethics and his moral obligation to see Benoit pay for his crime. Despite the possibility of being disbarred, he decides to antagonize Benoit into a confession on the stand.

== Cast ==
- Judd Nelson as Robin "Stormy" Weathers
- Elizabeth Perkins as Jo Ann
- John Hurt as Douglas Benoit
- Darren McGavin as Craig Duncan
- Dan Monahan as Larry
- David Alan Grier as Steve Hadley
- Nancy Marchand as Roberta Winnaker
- Allan Arbus as Phil Ames
- Edward Winter as Raymond Torkenson
- Richard Zobel as Matt Cowens
- Ray Walston as 1st Judge
- Robert Irvin Elliott as Scott Murray
- Beatrice Winde as 2nd Judge
- Art Hindle as Lt. Matt Sosha
- Priscilla Pointer as Mrs. Martha Williams

== Production ==
The film marked the feature screenwriting debut of David E. Kelley who was previously working as an attorney in Boston, Massachusetts. Kelley showed the script to Indian Neck Productions, who were clients of the law firm in which Kelley practiced, and optioned it and brought it to Bob Clark who worked with Kelley on rewrite. Steven Bochco was so impressed with Kelley's script that he hired him to be a story editor on L.A. Law.

== Release ==
The film was theatrically released on February 6, 1987.

== Reception ==
=== Box office ===
Released on February 6, 1987, the film grossed $9.5 million domestically.

=== Critical response ===
Rotten Tomatoes gives the film a score of 30% based on reviews from 23 critics. The site's consensus states: "From the Hip finds Judd Nelson flexing previously unseen acting muscles, but this legal comedy is too grating to pass the bar."

=== Awards ===
Judd Nelson was nominated for a Golden Raspberry Award for Worst Actor for his role in the film, where he lost to Bill Cosby for Leonard Part 6 at the 8th Golden Raspberry Awards.
