= Siesta (film) =

1987 film by Mary Lambert

- Theatrical release poster
- Directed by: Mary Lambert
- Screenplay by: Patricia Louisianna Knop
- Based on: Siesta by Patrice Chaplin
- Produced by: Gary Kurfirst
- Starring: Ellen Barkin; Gabriel Byrne; Julian Sands; Isabella Rossellini; Martin Sheen; Alexi Sayle; Grace Jones; Jodie Foster
- Cinematography: Bryan Loftus
- Edited by: Glenn A. Morgan
- Music by: Marcus Miller
- Distributed by: Lorimar Motion Pictures
- Release date: November 11, 1987
- Running time: 97 minutes
- Country: United States
- Language: English
- Budget: $3.5 million
- Box office: $604,491

Siesta is a 1987 American experimental drama film directed by Mary Lambert and starring Ellen Barkin, Gabriel Byrne and Jodie Foster. According to a 1987 article in The Los Angeles Times, the film "follows a daredevil through her final days leading up to a potentially fatal leap. Rife with Jungian imagery, the film is a post-modern fable of destiny and change, peopled with a gallery of lost souls including a guardian angel (played by British heartthrob Julian Sands), a sorceress (played by pop star Grace Jones) and the angel of death (Alexei Sayle)." It also stars Martin Sheen and Isabella Rossellini.

== Cast ==
- Ellen Barkin as Claire
- Gabriel Byrne as Augustine
- Julian Sands as Kit
- Isabella Rossellini as Marie
- Martin Sheen as Del
- Alexei Sayle as Cabbie
- Grace Jones as Conchita
- Jodie Foster as Nancy
- Anastassia Stakis as Desdra
- Gary Cady as Roger

== Production ==
The screenplay was written by Patricia Louisianna Knop, based on a novel by Patrice Chaplin. The film was shot on location in Spain, released by Lorimar Motion Pictures, and debuted in New York City on November 11, 1987. Jazz trumpeter Miles Davis performed on the score for the film, Music from Siesta, which was written and arranged by frequent Davis collaborator Marcus Miller.

== Reaction ==
Siesta received generally negative reviews. On review aggregator Rotten Tomatoes, the film has a 17% approval rating based on 6 reviews. It was hailed as "this year's Blue Velvet" by Susan Linfield, editor of American Film. The New York Times film critic Janet Maslin called it "the kind of excitingly bad, artily experimental film that has become an endangered species... Still, Miss Lambert's first feature has a game, mischievous spirit and a ripe bohemianism that are appealing." Critic Roger Ebert wrote that "The film is finally overwhelmed by its own ambition, not to mention one too many gimmicks in its plot, but it goes down swinging." However, Sheila Benson of The Los Angeles Times called the film “a monumentally bad, awesomely wrongheaded, pretentious conceit."

The film was nominated for an Independent Spirit Award for Best First Feature for director Mary Lambert at the 3rd Independent Spirit Awards in 1988. Grace Jones and Isabella Rosellini were both nominated for the Golden Raspberry Award for Worst Supporting Actress (with Rossellini also being nominated for her role in Tough Guys Don't Dance) at the 8th Golden Raspberry Awards.
