= Ishtar (film) =

1987 film by Elaine May

- Theatrical release poster
- Directed by: Elaine May
- Written by: Elaine May
- Produced by: Warren Beatty
- Starring: Dustin Hoffman; Warren Beatty; Isabelle Adjani; Charles Grodin; Jack Weston
- Cinematography: Vittorio Storaro
- Edited by: Richard P. Cirincione; William H. Reynolds; Stephen A. Rotter
- Music by: Bahjawa; Dave Grusin; Paul Williams
- Production company: Delphi V Productions
- Distributed by: Columbia Pictures
- Release date: May 15, 1987
- Running time: 107 minutes
- Country: United States
- Language: English
- Budget: $51 million
- Box office: $14.4 million

Ishtar is a 1987 American adventure comedy film written and directed by Elaine May, and produced by Warren Beatty, who co-stars opposite Dustin Hoffman. The story revolves around Chuck Clarke and Lyle Rogers, a duo of talentless American songwriters who travel to a booking in Morocco and stumble into a four-party Cold War standoff.

Shot on location in Morocco and New York City by cinematographer Vittorio Storaro, the production drew media attention before its release for substantial cost overruns on top of a lavish budget, and reports of clashes between May, Beatty and Storaro. A change in studio management at Columbia Pictures during post-production also led to professional and personal difficulties that undermined the film's release.

Ishtar polarized critics and became a notorious failure at the box office. Many initially considered it to be one of the worst films ever made, although critical support has increased significantly since release, (Note: Attributed to multiple references:) to the point where it received two votes for the greatest movie of all time in the 2022 edition of the British Film Institute's Sight and Sound decennial polls. Its 2004 DVD release excluded North America, where a director's cut, running two minutes shorter, was released on Blu-ray in August 2013.

== Plot ==
Chuck Clarke and Lyle Rogers are inept songwriters who are down on their luck, but dream of becoming a popular singing duo like Simon and Garfunkel. Though they are poorly received at a local open mic night, agent Marty Freed offers to book them as lounge singers in a hotel in Marrakesh, Morocco, explaining that the last act quit due to political unrest in the area. Nearly broke, both single, and without any better options, Lyle and Chuck decide to take the gig.

When they arrive in the fictional neighboring country of Ishtar, Chuck agrees to give his passport to a mysterious woman who claims her life is in danger. She promises to meet him in Marrakesh. Unfortunately, Chuck learns at the U.S. Embassy that it will take longer than expected to get a new passport. Lyle goes to Morocco in a bid to save their booking while Chuck stays behind. Alone in Ishtar, Chuck meets CIA agent Jim Harrison. Chuck agrees to be a mole for the CIA and, in return, Harrison gets Chuck to Morocco by the next evening.

Now together again, Chuck and Lyle unwittingly become involved in a plot to overthrow the Emir of Ishtar. The mysterious woman, Shirra Assel, sneaks into Lyle's room and tries to steal his luggage, mistaking it for Chuck's. At the airport, she had stuck some of her items into Chuck's luggage, because that was her only way of smuggling them out of Ishtar. She later breaks into their room and goes through Chuck's luggage, but she fails to find an ancient, prophetic map that her archaeologist brother Omar had found. Shirra needs this map in order to command the loyalties of the left-wing guerrillas who oppose the government of Ishtar.

Shirra later confronts Chuck and accuses him of working with the CIA, and Chuck accuses her of being a communist. Meanwhile, Lyle attempts to find a camel salesman named Mohamad and gives him the secret code of "I want to buy a blind camel," as per Shirra's instructions, but Lyle finds the wrong Mohamad and ends up actually buying a blind camel. Chuck and Lyle receive instructions from both the CIA and the leftist guerillas to go into the desert, and both parties actually intend for them to die there.

In the desert, Chuck pulls his jacket over his head to shield himself from the sun, and Lyle sees that the legendary map is sewn inside of the jacket. The jacket was originally Omar's, but Shirra took it, and then Chuck and Shirra traded jackets. The CIA sends helicopters to finish off Chuck and Lyle, but Shirra and a cab driver arrive in the desert and defend them.

Chuck and Lyle mail the map to their agent Marty, who blackmails the CIA with the map. The CIA ends up having to support Shirra leading social reforms in the country, and back an album written by Rogers and Clarke with a tour starting in Morocco. At the show, Shirra is in the audience. Meanwhile, a military officer orders the rest of the men in uniform that make up the audience to "APPLAUD!" when the songs are finished.

== Cast ==
- Dustin Hoffman as Chuck Clarke
- Warren Beatty as Lyle Rogers
- Isabelle Adjani as Shirra Assel
- Charles Grodin as Jim Harrison
- Jack Weston as Marty Freed
- Carol Kane as Carol
- Tess Harper as Willa Rogers
- Aharon Ipalé as Emir Yousef
- Fred Melamed as the Caid of Assari
- Fuad Hageb as Abdul
- David Margulies as Mr. Clarke
- Rose Arrick as Mrs. Clarke
- Julie Garfield as Dorothy
- Bill Bailey as General Westlake
- Christine Rose as Siri Darma
- Warren Clarke as English Gunrunner
- Arthur Brauss as German Gunrunner
- Matt Frewer as a CIA Agent
- Alex Hyde-White as a CIA Agent
- Ron Berglas as a CIA Agent (as Ron Berglas)
- Nadim Sawalha as Rug Shop Owner / Camel Seller
- Haluk Bilginer as the Guerrilla Leader
- Dylan Baker as Aghast Nightclub Patron

== Production ==
=== Development ===
==== Pre-production ====
Warren Beatty felt indebted to Elaine May, who, in addition to co-writing his 1978 hit Heaven Can Wait, had done a major uncredited rewrite on the script of his Academy Award-winning Reds and helped immensely with its post-production. He began looking for a project that she could write and direct. She never had a sufficiently protective producer, and by starring in and producing her next film he could give her the chance to make the film he believed her to be creatively and commercially capable of making.

At a dinner with Beatty and Bert Fields, their agent, May said she would like to do a variant on the Road to ... films of Bing Crosby and Bob Hope, set in the Middle East. Her idea would feature Beatty and a co-star as a mediocre singer-songwriter duo who would go to Morocco and get caught in the crossfire between the Central Intelligence Agency and a local left-wing guerrilla group. She thought it would be funny to cast Beatty against type as the Hope part, the bumbler of the duo, while the co-star, possibly Dustin Hoffman, would play the self-assured ladies' man that Crosby usually portrayed.

Hoffman, who was also indebted to May for her extensive uncredited rewrite on Tootsie, initially turned it down due to "misgivings". At Beatty's request, the two met with May and Hoffman's creative confidant, playwright Murray Schisgal. The latter two felt that the plot in Morocco overwhelmed the rest of the film and that it "should not leave New York". Hoffman was finally persuaded by Beatty's assurances that he would provide May with the room she needed to work. When May finished the script, Beatty, Hoffman, and some other friends including Charles Grodin had a meeting and read-through at Beatty's house. All present agreed that the script needed work, but it was funny and could be a hit.

Beatty went to Columbia Pictures production head Guy McElwaine, who years before had been his publicist, instructing Fields, "Bert, anything she wants. Period. That's my negotiating position." Despite the prospect of having two major stars on the same project with a well-regarded writer, McElwaine did not immediately approve it. He worried about the effects of having Beatty, Hoffman and May on the same set because they were all known to be perfectionists. May, in particular, had a reputation for shooting as much raw footage as Beatty or Stanley Kubrick. However, McElwaine was also afraid the property could be a hit for another studio if Columbia passed, because Beatty had a solid record of commercial success in his four movies as producer and star.

The two bankable stars and May received $12.5 million (equivalent to $38.7 million in 2025) in salaries before principal photography began. Beatty and Hoffman offered to defer theirs, but Columbia declined; Fields said that an agreement the studio had with HBO covered most of that cost. Beatty, Hoffman, and May all had final cut input as well (although Beatty has denied this). The film's original budget was set at $27.5 million.

Other roles were cast through connections to the three. Grodin was a friend of May and had starred in a successful comedy she directed, the original version of The Heartbreak Kid. Isabelle Adjani, who played the female lead, Shirra Assel, disguised as a boy for most of the film, was Beatty's girlfriend at the time. Vittorio Storaro replaced original cinematographer Giuseppe Rotunno when Rotunno was unable to change his schedule to accommodate a delay in shooting.

Paul Williams began working on the songs the lead duo would sing. "The real task was to write songs that were believably bad. It was one of the best jobs I've ever had in my life. I've never had more fun on a picture, but I've never worked harder." May preferred that Williams write whole songs, even if she intended to use only a few lines, and then teach them to the stars and have them perform them, necessitating more time and money.

The studio had wanted to shoot the desert scenes in the Southwestern United States in order to keep costs down and production under control. However, Columbia's parent company at the time, Coca-Cola, had money in Morocco it could not repatriate, so the studio relented and allowed production to take place in the Sahara Desert. It was expected that shooting in Morocco would take ten weeks, after which the New York scenes would be shot.

==== Principal photography ====
Ishtar began principal photography in October 1985, amidst high political tensions in North Africa. Israeli warplanes had just bombed Palestine Liberation Organization headquarters in Tunis and, seven days later, the Palestinian Liberation Front hijacked a cruise ship, the Achille Lauro, murdering an American citizen named Leon Klinghoffer. The Moroccan military was fighting the Polisario Front guerrillas at the time as well. There were rumors that Palestinian terrorists might try to kidnap Hoffman, and some locations had to be checked for land mines before the shooting could begin.

There were also production difficulties. The filmmakers appreciated the Moroccans' hospitality and willingness to cooperate, but there was no one in the country with experience supporting a major Hollywood film production. Requests by the producers were sometimes unfulfilled, and calls for local extras led to thousands of people showing up.

Some of the film's production woes have become Hollywood lore. The film's animal trainer went looking for a blue-eyed camel in the Marrakech market and found one he considered perfect. However, he chose not to buy it right away, expecting he could find others and use that knowledge to bargain with the first trader for a better price. He did not realize that blue-eyed camels were rare, and could not find another camel good enough. He returned to the first trader, who since had eaten the camel.

Another frequently related incident, as told by production designer Paul Sylbert but disputed by others on the film, concerns the dunes where scenes with Beatty and Hoffman lost in the desert would be shot. Sylbert had scouted dunes in the United States and Morocco but none seemed to fit the vision of May, who was very uncomfortable in the desert environment. She suffered from toothaches that she refused to have treated locally, and took extensive measures to shelter herself from the harsh sun, not only spending much of her time under a large parasol but wearing large sunglasses and wrapping her face in a white gauze veil, to the point that her appearance was compared to a Star Wars stormtrooper. After one unsuccessful search for dunes, Sylbert says, May suddenly announced she wanted a flat landscape instead. It took ten days to level an area of a square mile (2.6 km²).

May feuded with others on set as well. She and Storaro frequently differed over camera placements, because she was looking for the ideal comic effect while the cinematographer, who had little experience making comedies, sought the most ideal composition. Beatty often took Storaro's side in disputes between him and May. "She probably felt ganged up on by the two of them," Hoffman observed later on. Eventually, Beatty and May began quarreling, and Hoffman sometimes served as the mediator. He claims there were times when the two were not speaking to each other. May also did not get along with Adjani, which adversely affected the latter's relationship with Beatty.

The director remained aloof from the film's editing staff, taking copious notes during dailies but refusing to share them. As Columbia had feared, she shot a large amount of film as well, reportedly in one instance calling for fifty takes of vultures landing next to Beatty and Hoffman. Expenses continued to grow. "This was the kind of film where nobody would say 'Sorry, we can't afford that,'" according to Mac Brown, who monitored the budget. When a replacement part was needed for a camera, it was sent over to Morocco with a New York-based location coordinator instead of just being shipped, out of fear it might get lost or held up at customs. The coordinator's airfare and a week's hotel stay were paid for by the production.

Privately, both Beatty and May began to confess they had made a mistake. "I was going to give this gift to Elaine, and it turned out to be the opposite," Hoffman recalls Beatty telling him. Matters came to a head when it came time to shoot the film's climactic battle scenes. They were far outside May's background in improvisational theatre, and during a confrontation with Beatty, May said, "You want it done? You shoot it!" Many crew members said that, on any other film, the director would have been fired. Beatty knew that if he called her bluff, he would have had to finish directing the film, which would have been a major embarrassment given that his main objective in making the film was to give May the chance she had never had. He compromised by scaling back the battle scenes.

When the film returned to New York, Beatty told then-Columbia CEO Fay Vincent that May could not direct. However, he rejected another suggestion to fire her, citing his image as a supporter of women's rights. Vincent said he would do it, but Beatty said if he did then he and Hoffman would leave the uncompleted film as well. He proposed instead that every scene be shot twice, his way and May's, effectively doubling the movie's cost.

After a month-long break, the New York scenes were shot in early 1986, at Kaufman Astoria Studios and various locations. Due to union work rules, Storaro's Italian crew had to be doubled by a local standby crew, who were usually not needed but drew full pay for the entire shoot. It was also necessary to stop production for several days so Beatty and Hoffman could rehearse their songs.

In April 1986, a month after principal photography wrapped, Vincent fired McElwaine. His replacement as head of the production was David Puttnam, producer of Chariots of Fire and a longtime critic of Hollywood budgetary excesses. Among those films he had specifically criticized in the latter category was Reds, singling out Beatty in particular. He also publicly criticized Hoffman for allegedly using his star power to force rewrites to the 1979 film Agatha, which had promoted his minor character to a lead. After quitting as a producer of that film, Puttnam called Hoffman "the most malevolent person I have ever worked with".

==== Post-production ====
Due to his history with both stars, the new studio head promised to stay out of Ishtar's post-production, but Beatty and Hoffman felt that move was subtly intended to undermine the film by suggesting it was a failure for which he wanted to avoid responsibility. They worried it would hurt the film when it was released before Christmas 1986.

Interpersonal difficulties from Morocco continued in post-production. May was supposed to direct actors when they looped their lines in a recording studio, but sometimes left the job to Beatty or one of the editors. Most of those absences were in sessions with Adjani, who was required to lower her voice because her character had to pass as a boy for most of the film. This strained her relationship with Beatty even more.

The film's raw footage before editing, known as "rushes", came to 108 hours, more than three times that typical for a comedy. William Reynolds, one of the editors for the film, told CinemaEditor Magazine in 1991 that each roll consisted of a series of uncut rolling takes. Three teams of editors, one each for Beatty, Hoffman and May, worked almost continuously to produce cuts of the film to each principal's liking. Because McElwaine, whom he had tried to please as a friend, was no longer in charge, Beatty eventually relented to letting May cut the film her way, partly because he detested Puttnam and believed he was leaking negative information about Ishtar to the media. "Just tell the asshole to keep paying the bills," he is reported to have told another Columbia executive. The costs, which Puttnam had believed would come under control in post-production, instead continued to mount. It ended up taking nearly five months to create a rough cut of the film. After that, the editors slowly trimmed down the rough cut scene by scene.

Eventually, it became clear the film would not be ready in time for Christmas. When the release date of late spring of 1987 was announced, later than had been expected, stories in the media about the film's troubles increased. Industry insiders began to refer to it as The Road to Ruin and Warrensgate, after the expensive 1980 flop Heaven's Gate. Beatty, who had kept the media off the set during production, took these gibes personally, and he and May began to fight more frequently in the editing room.

Finally, with the new release date looming, Bert Fields was called in to mediate between the director and stars. Beatty denies this, but Fields and others say he was present in the editing room. The agent has been described as having final cut, although he claims that was May's. Tensions continued as Beatty was trying to placate Adjani and lobbied for more footage of her. Due to this, editor William Reynolds left the project early. When they were finished, the editors were furious as no one had gone over the complete film. Beatty refused to show Puttnam the final cut.

=== Sexual assault allegations ===
On December 14, 2017, Variety published a report in which a woman named Melissa Kester, as well as an additional source who chose to remain anonymous, accused Dustin Hoffman of sexually assaulting them during the production of Ishtar. This report came in part as a response to a series of sexual misconduct allegations made against Hoffman earlier that year.

In the Variety article, Kester, whose boyfriend worked on the music for Ishtar, alleged that, while recording a vocal track for one of the film's songs, Hoffman invited her into an isolation booth and inserted his fingers into her genitalia. Kester estimated that this interaction lasted for 15 to 20 seconds. Kester later recounted the incident to a close friend, who confirmed her account for the Variety article. In the same article, an anonymous source, who worked as an unnamed extra in one of the film's nightclub sequences, claimed that Hoffman engaged in a similar action while riding home from a wrap party with her in a station wagon. She also alleged that he then directed her to the San Remo apartment complex, where he lived at the time, and engaged in oral sex and sexual intercourse with her, interactions that she claimed arose from dubious consent on her part. The source was 22 years old at the time of the alleged incidents.

Hoffman did not provide any comment for the Variety article, nor has he responded to the allegations publicly. However, in response to the article, Hoffman's attorney Mark A. Neubauer wrote a letter to the Penske Media Corporation, which owns Variety, in which he called the allegations "defamatory falsehoods".

== Release ==
=== Box office ===
Negative buzz about Ishtar and its high budget was widespread in the press long before the film reached theaters. In an interview with May, Mike Nichols described the film as "the prime example that I know of in Hollywood of studio suicide", implying that Puttnam sandbagged the project by leaking negative anecdotes to the media because of his grudges against Beatty and Hoffman. Before release, market research led Columbia to believe the film would fail. Its head of marketing, Peter Sealey, advised the studio to minimize its losses by cutting the film's advertising budget. Instead, Columbia spent even more to promote the film, afraid of alienating Beatty and Hoffman. "Ego trumps logic in Hollywood," said Sealey.

Despite negative press, three previews went well, with Beatty describing one in Toronto as the best he had ever had, and he and the studio considered striking more prints. Those discussions ended following the opening weekend, wherein Ishtar, on more than 1,000 screens across the country, took in $4.2 million (equivalent to $11.9 million in 2025) in receipts, winning the weekend, being No. 1 at the box office. However, it outgrossed The Gate—a low-budget horror film with no stars—by a mere $100,000, and ultimately earned $14.3 million at the North American box office.

Against a $51 million production budget and up to another $20 million spent on prints and marketing costs, the film is estimated to have lost $40 million. Ishtar has become synonymous with the phrase "box office flop", and in 2014, the Los Angeles Times listed the film as one of the most expensive box-office flops of all time.

Chicago Reader critic Jonathan Rosenbaum surmised that the media were eager to torpedo Ishtar in retaliation for instances of Beatty's perceived "high-handed way with members of the press". The film had been completely closed to the media, with no reporters at all permitted on set during production, a restriction greater than Beatty's previous productions.

=== Critical reception ===
The film had a polarizing effect on critics upon release. The Washington Post's critics were split: Desson Thomson described the film as an "unabashed vamp for a pair of household names, and as such it works, often hilariously", while Hal Hinson wrote that "it's piddling—a hangdog little comedy with not enough laughs." Roger Ebert wrote for the Chicago Sun-Times that "Ishtar is a truly dreadful film, a lifeless, massive, lumbering exercise in failed comedy", and Gene Siskel called it "shockingly dull" and "dim-witted"; together, they selected it as the worst film of 1987 on At the Movies. Leonard Maltin gave the film 2-stars-out-of-4, writing "A blind camel and a flock of vultures steal the show, and Paul Williams' deliberately awful songs are funny too, but not funny enough to overcome the flatness of director May's script."

Janet Maslin of The New York Times was more forgiving, writing "The worst of it is painless; the best is funny, sly, cheerful and, here and there, even genuinely inspired." Vincent Canby—also for the Times—listed it as a runner-up to his top films of 1987. Sheila Benson of the Los Angeles Times was also positive, writing "It is a smart, generous, genuinely funny affair. Sometimes, like the camel who almost ambles away with the picture, it's longish in the tooth, but it is based on an extremely astute vision of life." A retrospective review from Jonathan Rosenbaum of the Chicago Reader stated: "This Elaine May comedy was the most underappreciated commercial movie of 1987. It isn't quite as good as May's previous features, but it's still a very funny work by one of this country's greatest comic talents."

On the review aggregator website Rotten Tomatoes, 40% of 60 critics' reviews are positive, with an average rating of 4.6/10. The website's consensus reads: "Warren Beatty, Dustin Hoffman, and laughter itself get lost in the desert during a flawed spoof of classic road movies that proves ill-suited for its mismatched and miscast stars." Metacritic, which uses a weighted average, assigned the film a score of 51 out of 100, based on 16 critics, indicating "mixed or average" reviews. Audiences surveyed by CinemaScore gave the film a grade "C+" on scale of A+ to F.

== Aftermath ==
As a result of the losses it suffered from the film and negative publicity, Coca-Cola re-evaluated its decision to enter the business. It spun off its entertainment holdings into a separate company named Columbia Pictures Entertainment (now Sony Pictures Entertainment), with Coca-Cola holding 49% of the stock. Two years later, it sold Columbia to Sony.

Ishtar was nominated for three Golden Raspberry Awards, including Worst Picture and Worst Screenplay, with May winning Worst Director, tied with Norman Mailer for Tough Guys Don't Dance at the 8th Golden Raspberry Awards. Ishtar also was nominated for Worst Picture at the 1987 Stinkers Bad Movie Awards. When the Stinkers unveiled their "100 Years, 100 Stinkers" list to present the 100 worst movies of the 20th century, Ishtar made the list and ranked at No. 20 in the listed bottom 20.

The film's failure did not affect the friendship between Beatty and Hoffman, who both liked the final cut; Beatty went on to cast his co-star in his more successful Dick Tracy. Beatty and May barely spoke for two years afterward, and friends of hers say she remains bitter about the experience. She would wait nine years before taking another screenwriting credit (for The Birdcage). She was nominated for an Academy Award for Best Adapted Screenplay for Primary Colors, but has not directed another film since Ishtar.

On December 20, 2010, Hoffman appeared on the Late Show with David Letterman with Robert De Niro. When Letterman asked the actors if any of their films made them "wince a little bit", Hoffman joked, "Well, I'm sure Bob feels ambivalent about Ishtar." (Letterman looked at his notes and observed that De Niro was not in that film.)

=== Legacy ===
The McClatchy-Tribune News Service wrote in 2011 that "Time has not improved this film's reputation as being one of the worst ever made." Time Out suggested it was "so bad it could have been deliberate" and called it "one of the worst films ever made." It was included in Michael Sauter's The Worst Movies of All Time book and Richard Roeper included it on his list of the 40 worst films he had seen. In 1999, Time placed the film on a list of the 100 worst ideas of the 20th century.

However, particularly since its 2013 Blu-ray release, Ishtar has received a wave of positive reviews and retrospectives from a number of publications, including the Los Angeles Times, Slate, IndieWire, and The Dissolve. Richard Brody of The New Yorker called Ishtar a "wrongly maligned masterwork" and raved, "There's a level of invention, a depth of reflection, and a tangle of emotions in Ishtar which are reached by few films and few filmmakers." Charles Bramesco of The Guardian wrote upon the film's 30th anniversary, "While Ishtar has not appreciated into a stealth masterpiece in the mold of Showgirls' long road to reappraisal, its stature as the definitive cinematic failure has been outed as undeserved." Filmmakers Quentin Tarantino, Lena Dunham, Joe Swanberg and Edgar Wright have all publicly praised Ishtar, and Martin Scorsese has further cited it as one of his favorite films of all time. The film received two votes, from critic Colin Beckett and filmmaker Daniel Goldhaber, on the 2022 list of the greatest films of all time as chosen by the British Film Institute's Sight and Sound decennial polls of critics and filmmakers.

In one of Gary Larson's The Far Side comic strips, captioned "Hell's Video Store", the entire store is stocked with nothing but copies of Ishtar. Larson later apologized, saying: "When I drew the above cartoon, I had not actually seen Ishtar. [...] Years later, I saw it on an airplane, and was stunned at what was happening to me: I was actually being entertained. Sure, maybe it's not the greatest film ever made, but my cartoon was way off the mark. There are so many cartoons for which I should probably write an apology, but this is the only one which compels me to do so."

The film's creators continue to defend it. Despite the trouble he endured while making it, Beatty has been quoted as saying, "There was almost no review that didn't in the first paragraph deal with the cost of the movie. That was an eye-opener—about the business, and the relationship of the entertainment press to business. Ishtar is a very good, not very big, comedy, made by a brilliant woman. And I think it's funny." Hoffman has also vouched for Ishtar, saying, "I liked that film. [...] Just about everyone I've ever met that makes a face when the name is brought up has not seen it. [...] I would do it again in a second." In 2006, May stated, "If all of the people who hate Ishtar had seen it, I would be a rich woman today."

A documentary about the film, Waiting for Ishtar: A Love Letter to the Most Misunderstood Movie of All Time, was released in 2017.

== Home media ==
Ishtar was issued on VHS globally in late 1987 (and once more in 1994), eventually generating more than seven million dollars in rental fees in the United States alone.

In 2004, the film was released on DVD on every continent but North America and Antarctica. Sony Pictures Home Entertainment had announced that the film would be released only on Blu-ray Disc (and finally in a digital format in North America) on January 4, 2011, but it was pulled from the studio's release schedule just before this date.

In an interview around the time, May said:

They tell me now—Sony—that they're going to release this on Blu-ray, and it will really look wonderful and sound wonderful. If they don't, you'll be the last 80 or 90 or however many people to see this movie in this particular version...If you all clap your hands and believe it! They say they want to and they'll do it soon, and I have great faith that they'll do it.

The Blu-ray was eventually released in North America on August 6, 2013.

== See also ==
- List of 20th century films considered the worst
