= Jonathan Reynolds (writer) =

American writer (1942–2021)

- Reynolds in 2009
- Born: February 13, 1942; Fort Smith, Arkansas, U.S.
- Died: October 27, 2021 (aged 79); Englewood, New Jersey, U.S.
- Occupation: Writer

Jonathan Reynolds (February 13, 1942 – October 27, 2021) was an American writer. He practiced as an actor for a short period before becoming a writer. He wrote for David Frost and Dick Cavett before a breakthrough with two comedy plays (Rubbers and Yanks 3, Detroit 0, Top of the Seventh) which ran off-Broadway in 1975. His most successful play was Geniuses at Playwrights Horizons in 1982, which was inspired by his time on the set of the war movie Apocalypse Now. Reynolds wrote several screenplays, receiving praise for his writing on the 1984 romantic comedy Micki & Maude. His other film work was less well received and he was awarded the 1988 Golden Raspberry Award for Worst Screenplay for 1987's Leonard Part 6. Reynolds returned to writing plays in the late 1990s and received a Pulitzer Prize for Drama nomination for his work on the 1997 play Stonewall Jackson's House. He wrote a food column for The New York Times Magazine between 2000 and 2005, publishing a selection of columns in book form in 2006. Reynolds returned to acting in 2003 leading in Dinner with Demons at the Second Stage Theater.

== Early life and acting career ==
Reynolds was born in Fort Smith, Arkansas, on February 13, 1942. His father was Donald Worthington Reynolds, founder of the Donrey media group, and his mother was Edith Reynolds. Reynolds attended Denison University in Ohio and received a bachelor of fine arts degree in 1965. He afterwards spent a year at the London Academy of Music and Dramatic Art. He returned to the United States and found work in New York as an understudy for the character of Rosencrantz in the Broadway run of Rosencrantz and Guildenstern Are Dead. Reynolds disliked the lack of influence actors had over the direction of the play so turned to writing.

== Playwriting ==
Reynolds became a writer for television personalities David Frost and Dick Cavett. His playwriting breakthrough came in 1975 with a simultaneous run of two one-act comedy plays: Rubbers about the New York State Legislature and Yanks 3, Detroit 0, Top of the Seventh about a veteran baseball pitcher. These ran at the off-Broadway American Place Theater for several months. The theater, usually operating on a subscription-only basis, found the plays so successful that it opened up to external sales for the first time in its then 11-year history. Newsweek described Reynolds as "a very funny new playwright ... his double bill is by far the funniest event of the season". The one-acts received their west coast premiere at the Back Alley Theatre in Los Angeles in 1980.

In 1978 Reynolds married Charlotte Kirk, with whom he had two sons: Edward and Frank. His 1979 play Tunnel Fever, also at the American Place Theater, lampooned the world of academia. Reynolds said of this work, "I don't think of my plays as comedies. I think about what characters would do in a situation, and I don't try to make it funny. It just comes out that way". Reynolds' biggest success in theater came with Geniuses, a satire of the movie industry that ran at Playwrights Horizons in 1982. Reynolds' inspiration came from a three-month stint in the Philippines, following Francis Ford Coppola during the making of his 1979 Vietnam War movie Apocalypse Now. Reynolds was there with the intention of writing a book about the making of the movie and also to contribute to the script. The book was never published and Reynolds' only contribution that made the final cut was a single line spoken by Robert Duvall's Lieutenant Colonel Bill Kilgore. Upon being told he could not surf near the battlefield Kilgore replies "What do you know about surfing, Captain, you're from New Jersey". Reynolds went uncredited for this contribution.

Geniuses received mostly good reviews; Mel Gussow said "The author speaks with an authority to match his acerbity ... Beneath the japery, there is a warning: Movies can be injurious to your health; keep them out of the reach of children-directors". But in The Boston Phoenix, David Edelstein wrote that "Reynolds’s praised-to-the-skies comedy" is the "biggest crock of the year" and a "stupefyingly feeble and careless work." By 1985 Reynolds had been selected for a Rockefeller Foundation grant "to promote the creative work of American writers". His play Fighting International Fat ran at Playwrights Horizons, off-Broadway, in June 1985. Reynolds was awarded an alumni citation by Denison University later that year.

== Screenwriting ==
Reynolds received his first film credit for the 1984 romantic comedy Micki & Maude. The New York Times film critic Vincent Canby said, of this work, that Reynolds "has an ear for ultra-high-frequency lunacies that escape the rest of us". Reynolds also worked on the 1987 film Leonard Part 6, a secret-agent comedy starring Bill Cosby. The film was poorly received with even Cosby criticising it. The Chicago Tribune's Gene Siskel called it "the year's worst film involving a major star" and it has featured on many lists of worst films ever made. Reynolds was awarded the 1988 Golden Raspberry Award for Worst Screenplay for this film.

Reynolds' 1988 screenplay for Switching Channels, a comedy set in a television news studio, also failed to impress the critics. He said that its failure "hurt for about a day and then I thought, 'Well, I'm not really part of it so it doesn't really bother me'". Reynolds considered himself more of a playwright than a screenwriter. He received only two more filmwriting credits, for the 1992 political comedy The Distinguished Gentleman and the 1988 science fiction comedy My Stepmother Is an Alien. The latter film was also poorly received and was the last screenplay Reynolds wrote.

== Return to theater and food writing ==
Reynolds returned to theater with his works including 1997's Stonewall Jackson's House and 2000's Girls in Trouble, both of which satirised a perceived liberal bias in the theater world. Stonewall Jackson's House received a Pulitzer Prize for Drama nomination. Reynolds divorced from Kirk in 1998.

Reynolds began writing a regular food column in The New York Times Magazine in 2000. Reynolds had no formal training in cooking but was a keen amateur who kept a diary of meals he had prepared or eaten. He continued the column for five years, including comic anecdotes alongside his recipes and cooking tips. Reynolds published a collection of columns as a 2006 book entitled Wrestling with Gravy: A Life, with Food.

In 2003 he returned to theater acting, starring in Dinner with Demons at the off-Broadway Second Stage Theater. The set, which was dressed by Heidi Ettinger, included a fully-functioning kitchen which Reynolds used to deep-fry a turkey during his performance. For legal reasons, the audience could not eat the food but it was served to the backstage crew. Reynolds married Ettinger in 2004, becoming stepfather to her three sons. That same year he received a Guggenheim Fellowship for playwriting.

Reynolds died of organ failure at Englewood, New Jersey, on October 27, 2021, aged 79.
