= Tough Guys Don't Dance (film) =

1987 film by Norman Mailer

- Theatrical release poster
- Directed by: Norman Mailer
- Screenplay by: Norman Mailer
- Based on: Tough Guys Don't Dance by Norman Mailer
- Produced by: Menahem Golan; Yoram Globus
- Starring: Ryan O'Neal; Isabella Rossellini; Debra Sandlund; Wings Hauser; Lawrence Tierney; John Bedford Lloyd; Frances Fisher
- Cinematography: Mike Moyer
- Edited by: Debra McDermott
- Music by: Angelo Badalamenti
- Production companies: Zoetrope Studios; Golan-Globus
- Distributed by: The Cannon Group
- Release date: September 18, 1987
- Running time: 109 minutes
- Country: United States
- Language: English
- Budget: $5–10 million
- Box office: $343,300

Tough Guys Don't Dance is a 1987 American crime mystery drama film written and directed by Norman Mailer based on his novel of the same name. It is a murder mystery/film noir piece. It was screened out of competition at the 1987 Cannes Film Festival.

The film received mixed reviews from critics and was a box office bomb. It was also nominated for four 1988 Independent Spirit Awards.

== Plot ==
A month after his party-obsessed wife Patty Lareine left him, Tim Madden's father Dougy tells Tim that he has stopped chemotherapy because "tough guys don't dance". Tim reveals in turn that there are parts of two murdered bodies in his cellar, and that while he doesn't think that he murdered them, he has been suffering from blackouts and hallucinations. Five days earlier, Tim spent the night doing cocaine and having sex with pornographic film actress Jessica Pond in front of her partner Lonnie Pangborn. He awoke to discover bloody clothing in his car and the name of his former girlfriend Madeleine Falco tattooed on his arm. When the new Provincetown police chief Luther Regency, now married to Madeleine, warned Tim to remove his marijuana stash from the woods before state troopers found it, Tim discovered a severed head hidden in the stash.

Regency tells Tim that Lonnie committed suicide and Jessica is missing. In a flashback, Tim remembers meeting Madeleine when he was a bartender, then meeting Patty and encouraging Madeleine to swing with her and husband Big Stoop. Patty promised to get rid of Big Stoop, marry and then divorce a rich man for his money, then marry Tim to finance his dreams of being a writer. An argument between Tim and Madeleine while driving caused their car to crash, rendering Madeleine infertile. Later, after spending time in prison for dealing cocaine, Tim reunited with Patty who'd married her rich man, Tim's former classmate Wardley Meeks III. She convinced him to hire Tim as Patty's chauffeur then filed for divorce. Tim testified against Wardley to help her get a large settlement.

The day before the film's opening, Tim reunited with Madeleine. She tells him Regency and Patty are having an affair and suggests killing them. That night, Regency tells Tim he thought Lonnie and Jessica had been sent to buy cocaine from him with $2 million provided by Patty and Wardley. Regency suspects Tim murdered Lonnie and Jessica. Tim goes to check his stash and discovers there are now two severed heads, and is assaulted by his friends Spider and Stoodie before escaping with the heads.

Dougy disposes of the heads, which are Patty's and Jessica's, at sea. Tim is kidnapped by Wardley, who admits to sending Spider and Stoodie to assault him before killing them both. Tim is taken to Helltown where Spider, Stoodie, Patty and Jessica are buried. Wardley tells Tim that he and Patty had sent Jessica and Lonnie to buy cocaine from Regency, but Jessica shot Lonnie when he threatened to leave with the money. When Patty and Regency arrived, Jessica threatened to turn them both in, but was shot by Patty. Regency took the money, hid Jessica's head, and had sex with Patty. Wardley shot Patty after she revealed that there never was any cocaine, that she and Regency had scammed him, and that they were blackmailing him for an additional $10 million. After these confessions, Wardley shoots himself.

Tim finds Madeleine waiting outside his home, and they kiss. Regency drunkenly admits to framing Tim as revenge for what he did to Madeleine, and to being in love with Patty. Tim tells Regency Patty is dead and he suffers a stroke. While recovering in bed, Regency taunts Madeleine as inferior to Patty, and Madeleine shoots him. Tim and Dougy dispose of the seven bodies at sea, and Madeleine uses the $2 million to buy a house for her and Tim.

== Cast ==
- Ryan O'Neal as Tim Madden
- Isabella Rossellini as Madeleine Regency
- Debra Sandlund as Patty Lareine Madden
- Wings Hauser as Chief Alvin Luther Regency
- John Bedford Lloyd as Wardley Meeks III
- Lawrence Tierney as Dougy Madden
- Penn Jillette as Big Stoop
- Frances Fisher as Jessica Pond
- R. Patrick Sullivan as Lonnie Pangborn
- Stephan Morrow as Stoodie
- John Snyder as Spider
- Clarence Williams III as Bolo
- Ira Lewis as Merwyn Finney
- Ed Setrakian as Lawyer

== Production ==
The script was revised by Robert Towne, a script doctor. The production was filmed on location in Provincetown, Massachusetts.

== Reception ==
=== Box office ===
The film was a box office bomb, making only $858,250; less than a fifth of its $5 million budget.

=== Critical reception ===
Tough Guys Don't Dance received mixed reviews. It holds a 39% rating at Rotten Tomatoes based on 23 reviews.

Hal Hinson of The Washington Post said that the film was "hard to classify; at times you laugh raucously at what's up on the screen; at others you stare dumbly, in stunned amazement". Roger Ebert, in a 2 1/2 star review in the Chicago Sun-Times praised the cinematography, the Provincetown setting, and said that the relationship between Tim (Ryan O'Neal) and Dougy Madden (Lawrence Tierney) was the best aspect of the film, but also said that "what is strange is that Tough Guys Don't Dance leaves me with such vivid memories of its times and places, its feelings and weathers, and yet leaves me so completely indifferent to its plot. Watching the film, I laughed a good deal".

However, the film had its supporters. Jonathan Rosenbaum of the Chicago Reader, said "Norman Mailer's best film, adapted from his worst novel, shows a surprising amount of cinematic savvy and style". He continued:

He translates his high rhetoric and macho preoccupations (existential tests of bravado, good orgasms, murderous women, metaphysical cops) into an odd, campy, raunchy comedy-thriller that remains consistently watchable and unpredictable—as goofy in a way as Beyond the Valley of the Dolls. Where Russ Meyer featured women with oversize breasts, Mailer features male characters with oversize egos, and thanks to the juicy writing, hallucinatory lines such as 'Your knife is in my dog' and 'I just deep-sixed two heads' bounce off his cartoonish actors like comic-strip bubbles; even his sexism is somewhat objectified in the process.

Michael Wilmington wrote in the Los Angeles Times:

Some will find Tough Guys Don't Dance ludicrous; others will complain that it lacks big studio movie flash. True—but why mourn the absence of an expertise mostly made to distract audiences from the emptiness of the story they're being told? Whatever else you can say about this film, it's alive with ideas and a rich, strange view of the world. Even at its most awkward moments, Mailer's brilliance shines out of nearly every scene...He almost revives the soul, as well as the surface, of film noir, making it again a dark, lucid mirror of society's corruptions, wicked hypocrisies and evil glamour.

Dave Kehr of the Chicago Tribune called the film true camp which can't be created self-consciously, observing that "Mailer begins from a position of personal involvement and at least partial sincerity, which makes the movie's ascent into sheer outrageousness seem more delirious, more dangerous and finally more entertaining. It isn't a good film (it doesn't want to be one), but it is a weird and funny evening at the movies". Vincent Canby of The New York Times said that the film was "not the high point of the Mailer career, but it's a small, entertaining part of it".

The scene in which Tim discovers his wife Patty Lareine (Debra Sandlund) is having an affair has become famous due to its melodramatic line delivery and repetition of the phrase "Oh man, oh god!" Channel 4 Film said "The overkill is strangely compelling and Mailer's disregard for taste and convention ensure his film is a massive but spectacular and unmissable folly".

=== Home media ===
Metro-Goldwyn-Mayer, which owns much of Cannon's film library, released the film in an anamorphic widescreen edition on DVD on September 16, 2003. The disc contained an interview with Norman Mailer, a tour of Provincetown and the film's trailer. In August 2021 the film was released on Blu-ray by cult film label Vinegar Syndrome.

== Awards ==
Group	Award	Result
Independent Spirit Awards 1988	Best Cinematography (John Bailey)	Nominated
Independent Spirit Awards 1988	Best Feature (Menahem Golan and Yoram Globus)	Nominated
Independent Spirit Awards 1988	Best Female Lead (Debra Sandlund)	Nominated
Independent Spirit Awards 1988	Best Supporting Male (Wings Hauser)	Nominated

Group	Award	Result
Golden Raspberry Awards 1988	Worst Director (Norman Mailer)	Won, tied with Elaine May for Ishtar
Golden Raspberry Awards 1988	Worst Actor (Ryan O'Neal)	Nominated
Golden Raspberry Awards 1988	Worst Actress (Debra Sandlund)	Nominated
Golden Raspberry Awards 1988	Worst New Star (Debra Sandlund)	Nominated
Golden Raspberry Awards 1988	Worst Picture (Menahem Golan and Yoram Globus)	Nominated
Golden Raspberry Awards 1988	Worst Screenplay (Norman Mailer)	Nominated
Golden Raspberry Awards 1988	Worst Supporting Actress (Isabella Rossellini, also for Siesta)	Nominated

== Soundtrack ==
The CD soundtrack composed and conducted by Angelo Badalamenti is available on Music Box Records' label.
