= Bernard Williams (producer) =

British film producer (1942–2015)

Bernard Telvin Williams (10 May 1942 – 4 January 2015) was a British film producer. His credits include two movies with Stanley Kubrick as well as six films for the director Frank Oz.

Williams was born in London. He began his career in filmmaking by working inside the mailroom of Associated British Pictures when he was a teenager. He later married Valerie Norman Dannels, the daughter of the film director Leslie Norman, with whom he had three children. He and his family moved from the United Kingdom to Los Angeles, California, in 1981, to pursue his production career. Williams' marriage to Dannels ended in divorce.

Williams served as the second and third director for two productions in the early 1960s: the science fiction film The Day the Earth Caught Fire (1961) and the thriller Bunny Lake Is Missing (1965). He also worked as a production manager for the British television series The Prisoner (1967–68), a project associated with the actor Patrick McGoohan. Additionally, he served as a production manager for the film Battle of Britain (1969), which was directed by Guy Hamilton.

Williams was an associate producer on Stanley Kubrick's A Clockwork Orange (1971) and Barry Lyndon (1975). He was producer or associate producer on six films with director Frank Oz: Dirty Rotten Scoundrels (1988), What About Bob? (1991), Housesitter (1992), The Indian in the Cupboard (1995), Bowfinger (1999), and The Score (2001).

Williams also produced The Big Sleep (1978), a remake of the 1946 film; Flash Gordon (1980); Ragtime (1981); The Bounty (1984), starring Mel Gibson and Anthony Hopkins; Manhunter (1986), directed by Michael Mann; and Daredevil (2003), a superhero film starring Ben Affleck. With Rosilyn Heller, Williams co-produced Who's That Girl (1987), starring Madonna.

His additional production credits include The Last Remake of Beau Geste (1977); So I Married an Axe Murderer (1993); and Blood and Wine (1996). His last film was Charlotte's Web (2006).

Williams died from stomach cancer in Burbank, California, on 4 January 2015, at the age of 72.
