= Debra Stipe =

American television and film actress (born 1962)

- Born: Debra Sandlund; May 29, 1962 (age 64); Evanston, Illinois, U.S.
- Years active: 1986–present
- Spouse: Greg Stipe (m. 1991)
- Website: stipestudio.com

Debra Stipe (née Sandlund; born May 29, 1962, in Geneseo, Illinois) is an American television and film actress. She's a graduate of Northwestern University where she studied both Opera and Theatre. She won the Miss Dream Girl USA 1987 Pageant and had a recurring role as Cindy on Full House opposite Bob Saget. Since marrying Greg Stipe in 1991, she is usually billed as "Debra Stipe". She and her daughter Sarah run an acting coaching studio in Cumming, Georgia.

== Career ==
=== '80s career ===
After winning the Miss Dream Girl USA 1987 Pageant she garnered attention and dove into acting in film and television. 1987 She got a role in the independent movie Tough Guys Don't Dance earning a nomination for Best Female Lead from the Independent Spirit Awards. She guest starred in several well-known series including NBC action-adventure series The A-Team, Fox's police crime drama 21 Jump Street starring Johnny Depp, NBC's legal drama L.A. Law, NBC and later ABC legal drama/mystery series Matlock starring Andy Griffith, ABC's Moonlighting starring Cybil Shepherd and Bruce Willis, and ABC's sitcom Who's the Boss? starring Tony Danza.

=== '90s career ===
She continued success in television guest starring on popular series ABC's Head of the Class, NBC's sitcom Blossom starring Mayiam Bialik, ABC's sitcom Full House opposite Bob Saget, NBC and later CBS police procedural/crime drama In the Heat of the Night opposite Alan Autry in two episodes serving as the backdoor pilot for what would have been a spin-off series, but it was never picked up. She guest starred on Murder, She Wrote starring Angela Lansbury, and Parker Lewis Can't Lose.

=== Later career ===
She hit an acting dry spell in the 2000s with a single acting credit guest starring on single episode of the Lifetime drama series Army Wives. In the 2010s she returned to television guest starring in Tyler Perry's House of Payne, Devious Maids, Satisfaction, Queen Sugar, and acted, produced and wrote the series Life @ Stipes.

== Filmography ==
=== Film ===
Year	Title	Role	Notes
1987	Tough Guys Don't Dance	Patty	Nominated — Golden Raspberry Award for Worst New Star; Nominated — Golden Raspberry Award for Worst Actress; Nominated — Independent Spirit Award for Best Female Lead
1989	Murder by Numbers	Leslie	
1990	Victimless Crimes	Louise	
1992	Gladiator	Charlene	
2017	Father Figures	Karen Bradshaw	
2022	The Mulligan	Stephanie St. Paul	
2023	Divine Influencer	Lilianne Lee	

=== Television ===
Year	Title	Role	Notes
1986	Miss Hollywood 1986	Herself	TV Special
1986	The A-Team	Tram Guide	"The Say U.N.C.L.E. Affair"
1987	Crime Story	Joanne Goldman	4 episodes Season 1 (3 episodes) — 1.18 "The Survivor" — 1.19 "The Pinnacle" — 1.20 "Top of the World"; Season 2 (1 episode) — 2.1 "The Senator, the Movie Star, and the Mob"
1987	Ohara	Judy Fisher	"The Sparrow"
1987	Private Eye	Desi France	"High Heels and Silver Wings"
1988	21 Jump Street	Penny Able	"A Big Disease with a Little Name"
1988	Hotel	Melissa Robinson	(Uncredited) "Power Play"
1988	L.A. Law	Jane Lauderbach	"Romancing the Drone"
1988	Hunter	Susan Stevens	"Presumed Guilty"
1989	Heartbeat	Nina	"Paradise Lost"
1989	Matlock	Kelly Manning / Ann Wilson	"The Black Widow"
1989	Day by Day	Monica	"Harmless Harper"
1989	Moonlighting	Claudette	"Those Lips, Those Lies"
1989	Jake and the Fatman	Sireen	"Poor Butterfly"
1989	Peter Gunn	Sheila	TV Movie
1989	Who's the Boss?	Vickie	"Sex, Lies and Exercise Tape"
1990	Open House	Chloe	"Who Framed Roger McSwain?"
1990	Macusco, FBI	Julia Hack / Sherry London	"Daryl Ross & the Supremes"
1990	Head of the Class	Linda Bassler	"Teacher's Pet"
1990	Blossom	Mrs. Young	"Pilot"
1990	Lifestories	Sadie Maxwell	"Beverly Whitestone, Dan Drabowski, Sadie Maxwell, Lois Barnes"
1990	Full House	Cindy	Season 4 (3 episodes) — 4.10 "Terror in Tanner Town" — 4.11 "Secret Admirer" — 4.13 "Happy New Year"
1990	Iran: Days of Crisis	Debra Scott	TV Movie
1991	In the Heat of the Night	Pat Day	2 episodes Season 4 (1 episode) — 4.20 "Just a Country Boy"; Season 5 (1 episode) — 5.6 "Unfinished Business"
1991–1992	Murder, She Wrote	Dr. Christie Morgan / Sally Bates	2 episodes Season 7 (1 episode),br/>— 7.16 "From the Horse's Mouth" (1991); Season 9 (1 episode) — 9.2 "Family Secrets" (1992)
1992	Parker Lewis Can't Lose	Rebecca	"Dance of Romance"
1992	Madame Montand and Mrs Miller	Marilyn Monroe	TV Movie
1996	The Cape	Kathy Blake	"Judgment Call"
2009	Army Wives	Mrs. Decker	"Operation: Tango"
2011	House of Payne	Estelle Rodgers	"Roommate Paynes"
2012	Let's Stay Together	Annie	"Beauty and the Birthday"
2013	Devious Maids	Delia	"Totally Clean"
2014	Being Mary Jane	Female Therapist	"Mixed Messages"
2014	Satisfaction	Irene	"...Through Partnership"
2014–2017	If Loving You Is Wrong	Dr. Raston	3 episodes Season 1 (1 episode) — 1.8 "14 Weeks" (2014); Season 3 (2 episodes) — 3.14 "A Fatal Attraction" (2017) — 3.19 "Don't Lose Your Deposit" (2017)
2015	Running	Joyce Dunham	"Pilot"
2016	Queen Sugar	Lisa	"The Darker Sooner"
2018	The Quad	Annie Folsom	"#TheColorPurple"
2019	Tales	Renee	"XO Tour Llif3"
2019	Life @ Stipe	Debra Stipe	Actress / Producer (3 episodes), Writer (1 episode) — "Road to Love" — "Negotiation Station" (written by) — "Christmas in the South"
2023	Will Trent	Reese Fox	"Should I Go Get My Tin Foil Hat?"
