= 17th Golden Raspberry Awards =

Award ceremony

- Date: March 23, 1997
- Site: Hollywood Roosevelt Hotel, Los Angeles, California

Highlights
- Worst Picture: Striptease
- Most awards: Striptease (6)
- Most nominations: Striptease (7)

The 17th Golden Raspberry Awards were held on March 23, 1997, at the Hollywood Roosevelt Hotel to recognise the worst the movie industry had to offer in 1996. Striptease took home the most Razzies of the evening, winning 6 out of 7 nominations, including Worst Picture.

Despite receiving critical and commercial success, animated musical drama film The Hunchback of Notre Dame earned Walt Disney Animation Studios its first and currently only Razzie nomination.

== Awards and nominations ==
Winner (in bold)
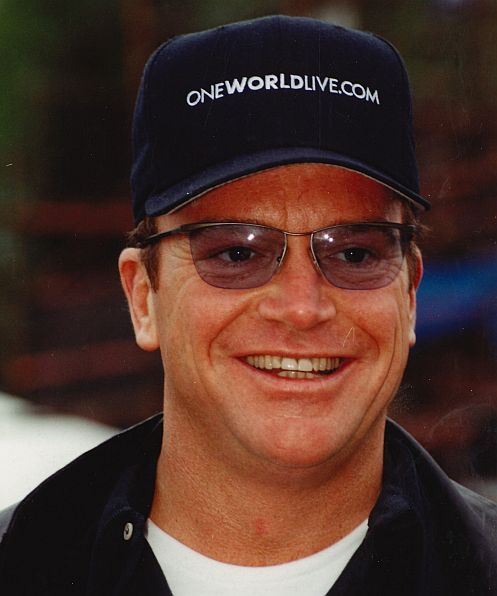
Tom Arnold, Worst Actor co-winner.

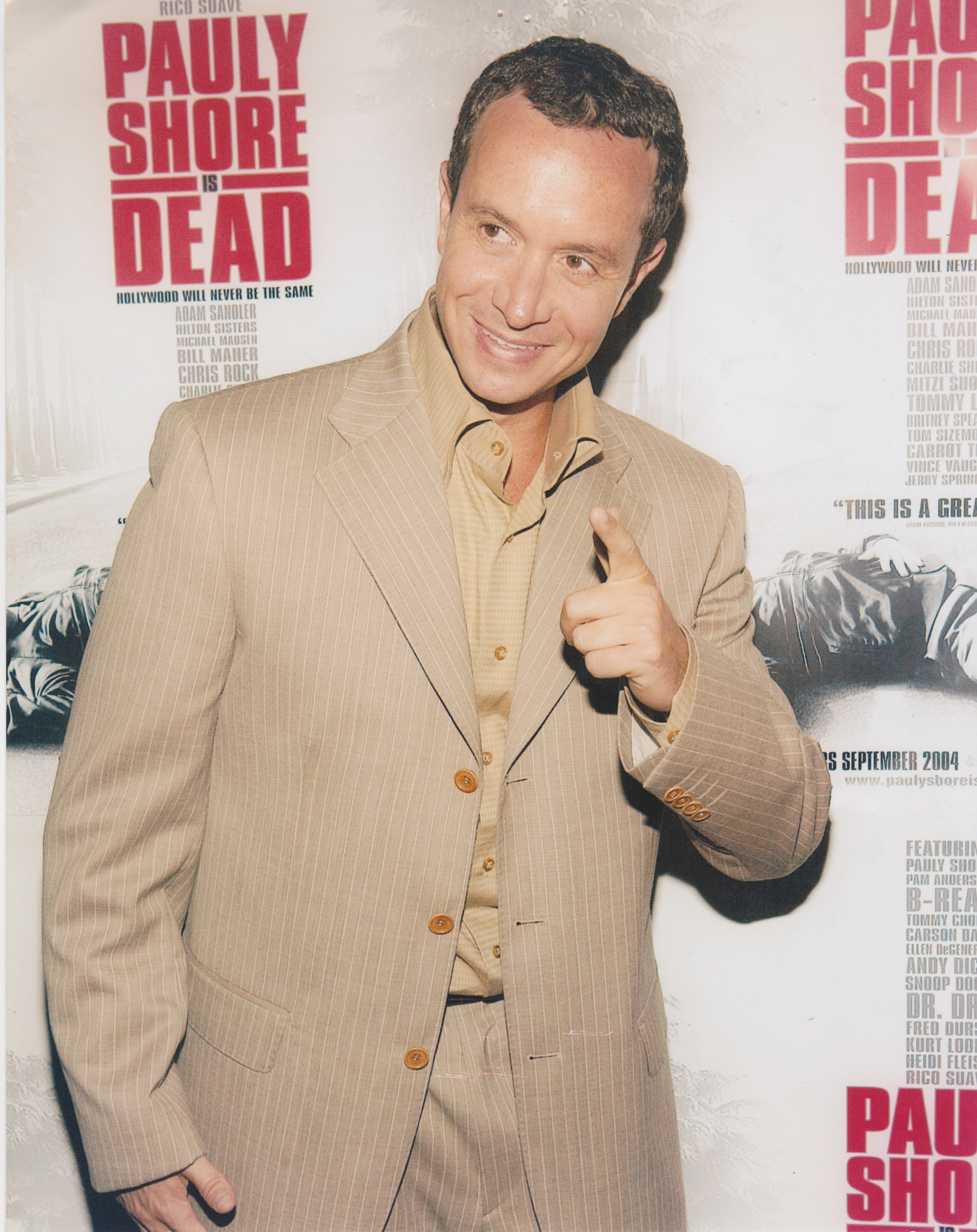
Pauly Shore, Worst Actor co-winner.

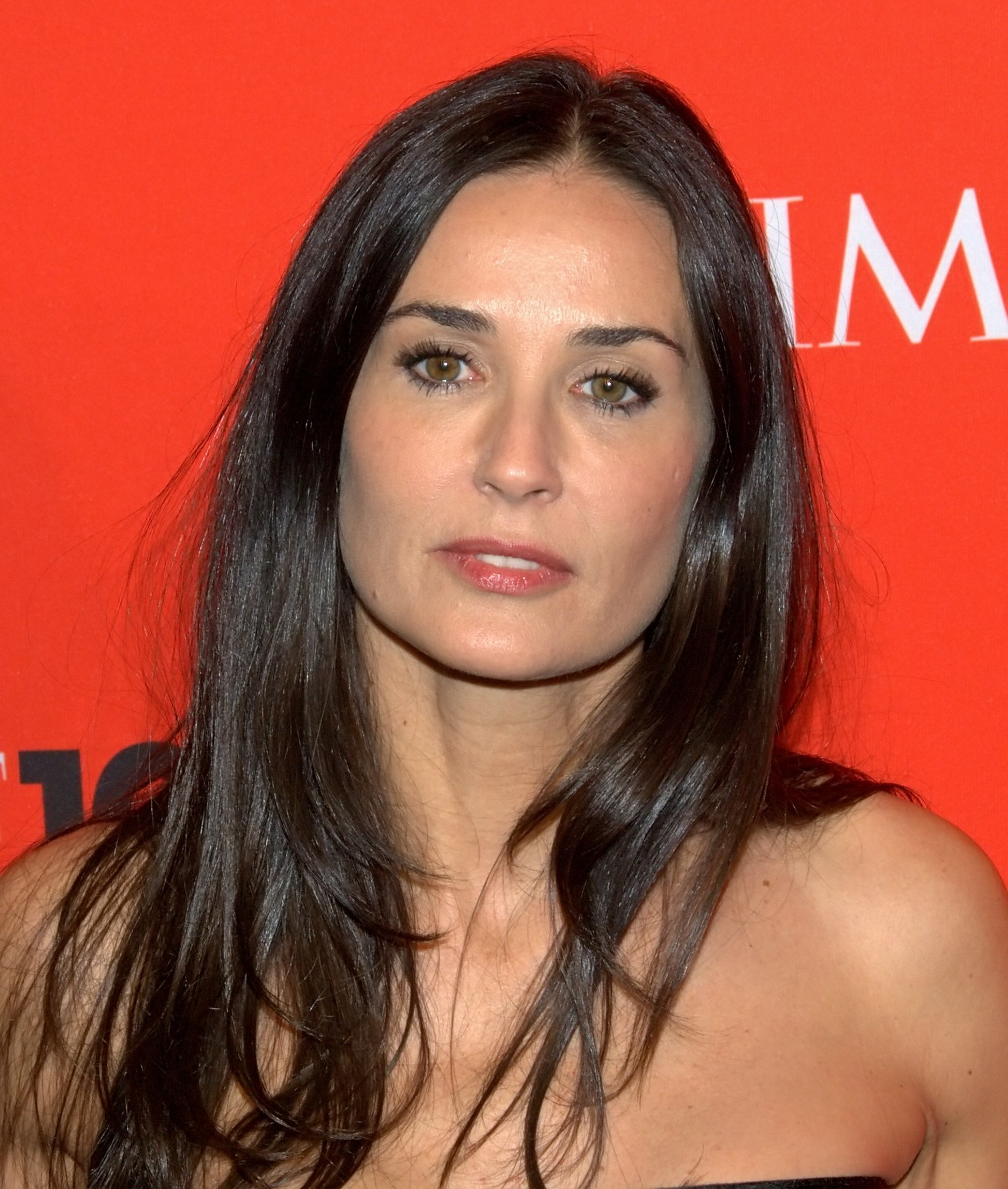
Demi Moore, Worst Actress winner and Worst Screen Couple co-winner.

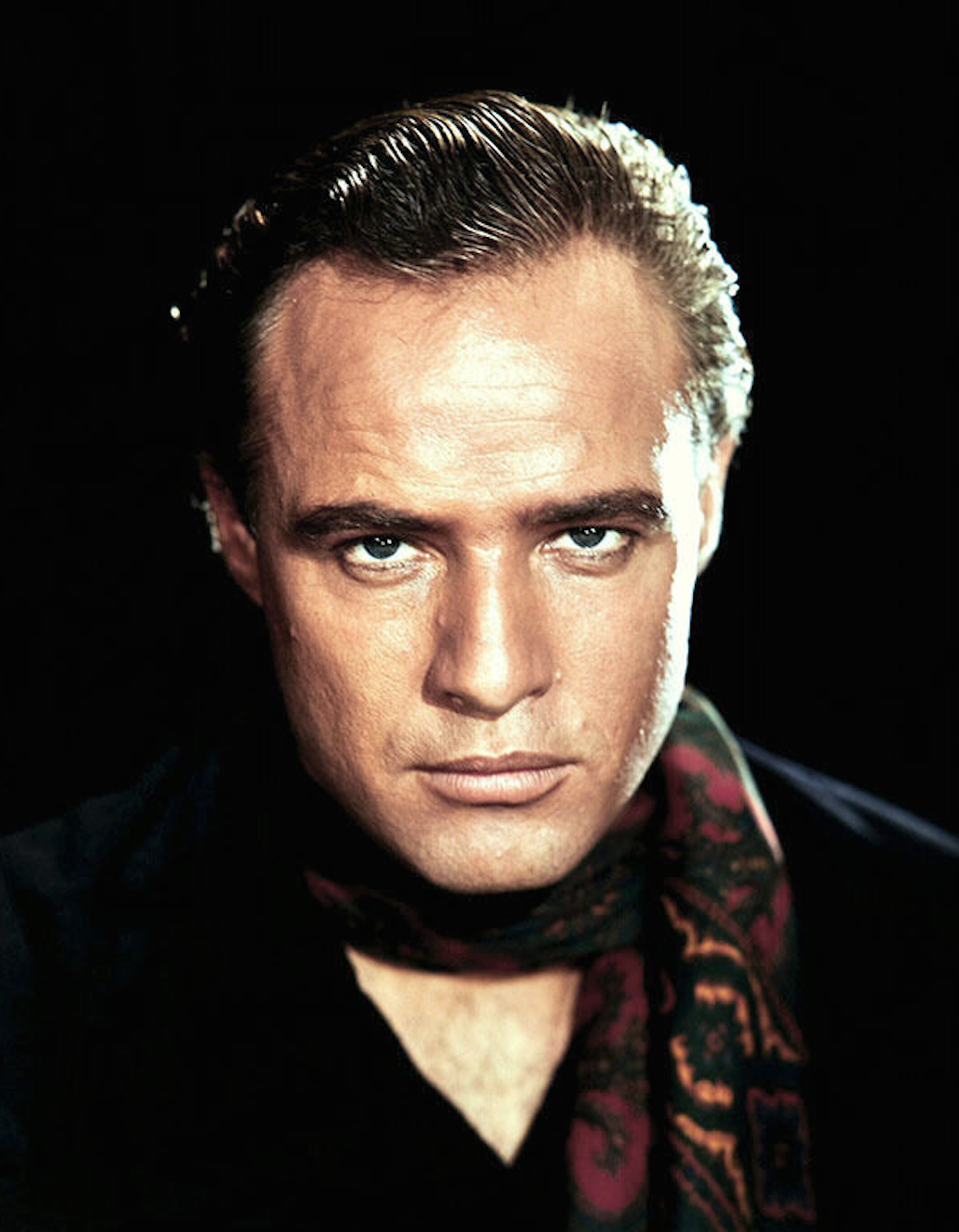
Marlon Brando, Worst Supporting Actor winner.

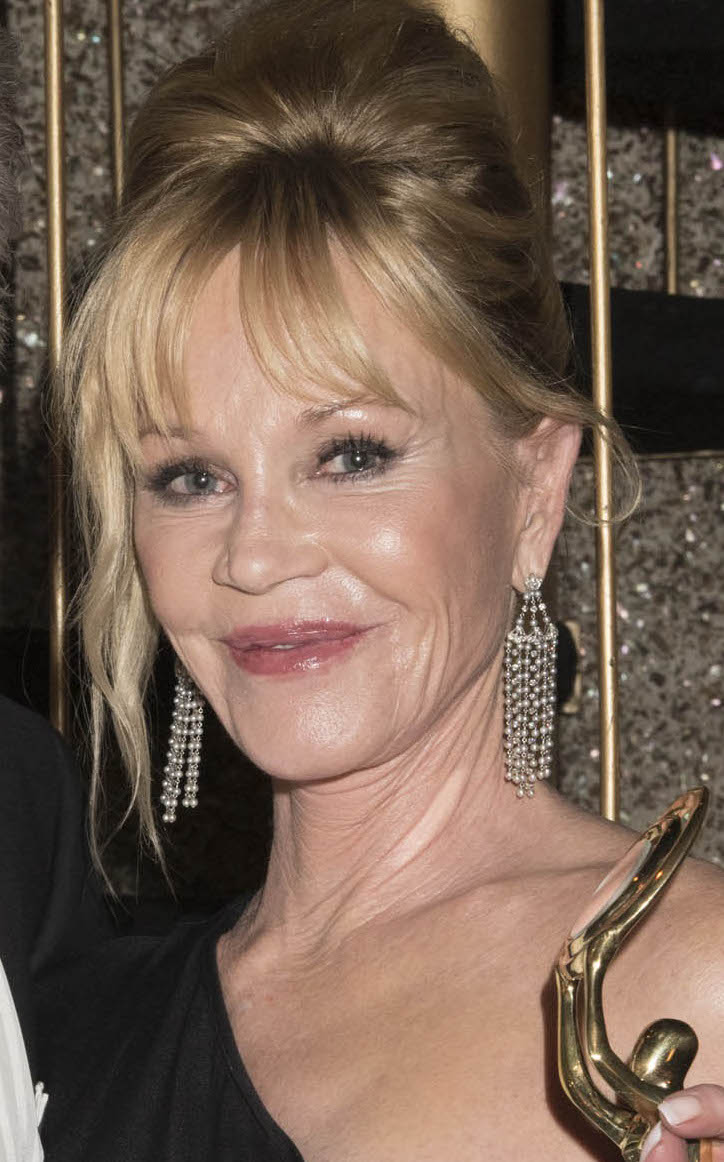
Melanie Griffith, Worst Supporting Actress winner.

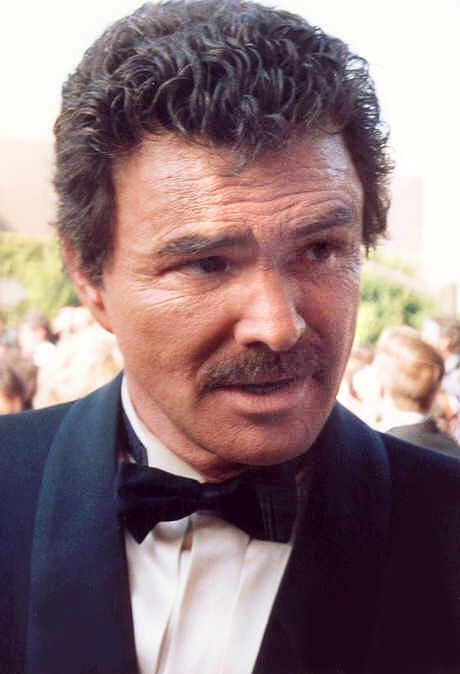
Burt Reynolds, Worst Screen Couple co-winner.

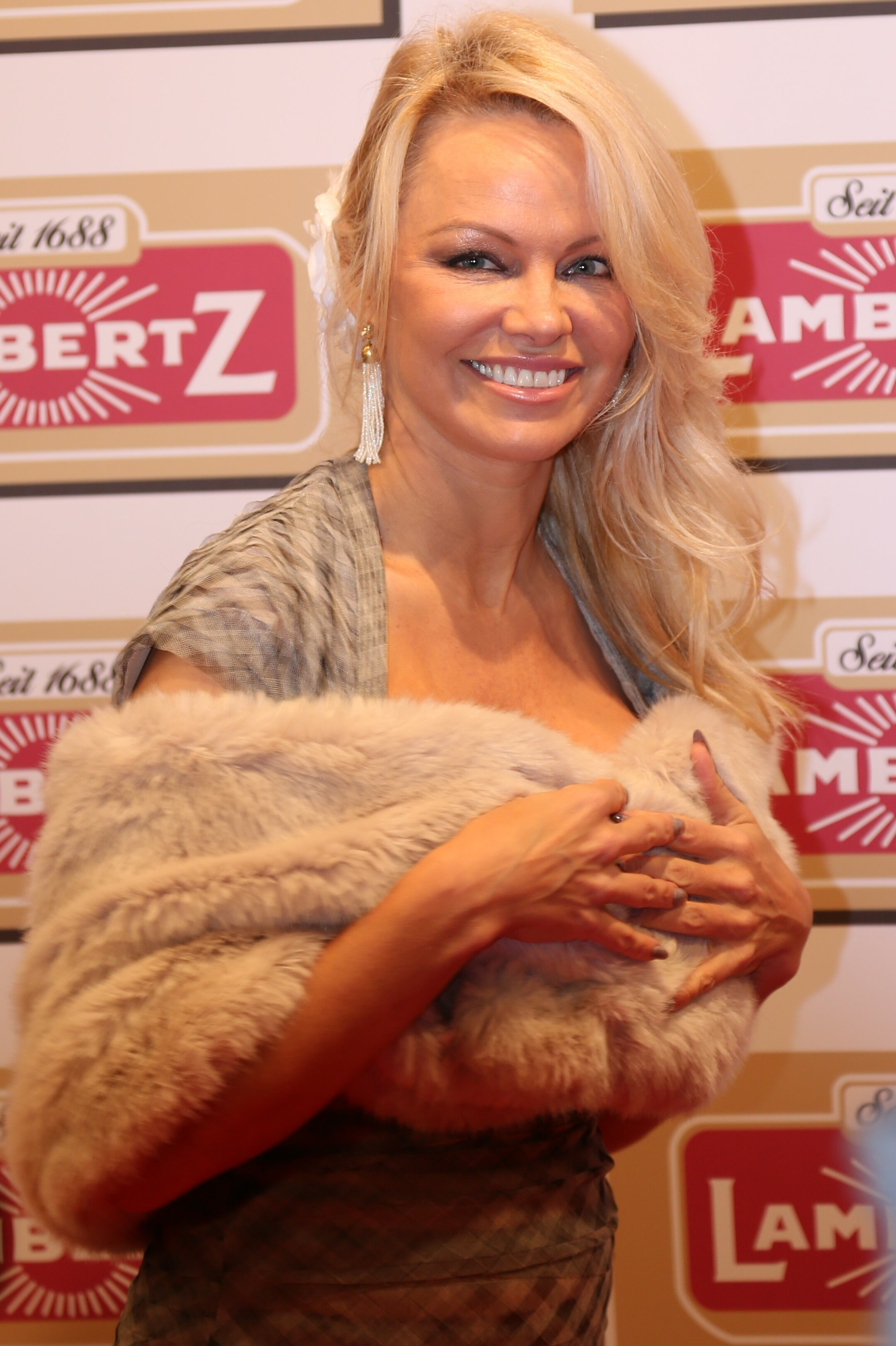
Pamela Anderson, Worst New Star co-winner.

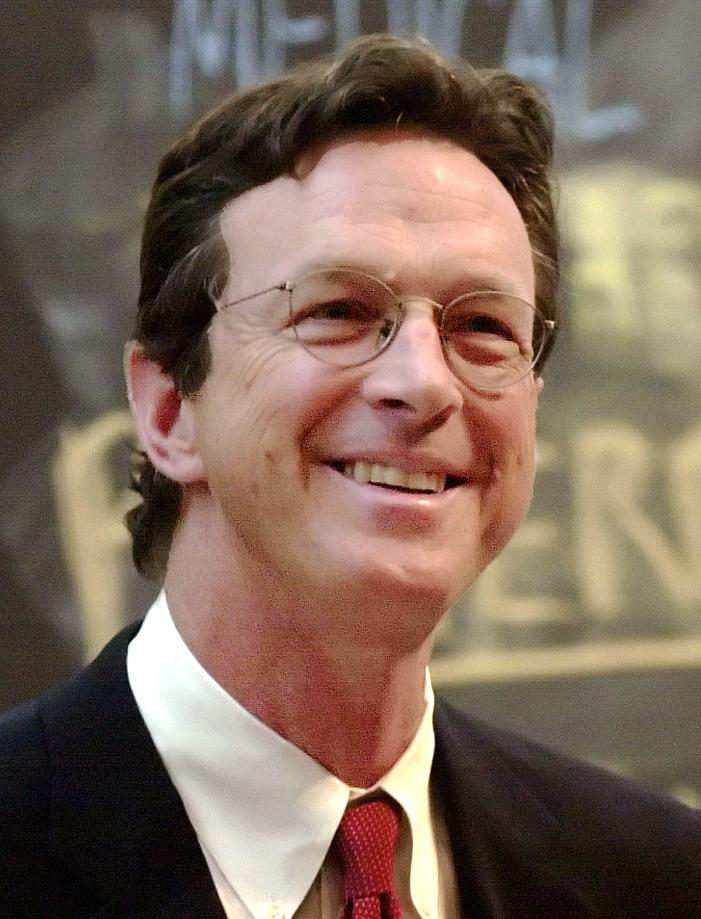
Michael Crichton, Worst Written Film Grossing Over $100 Million co-winner.

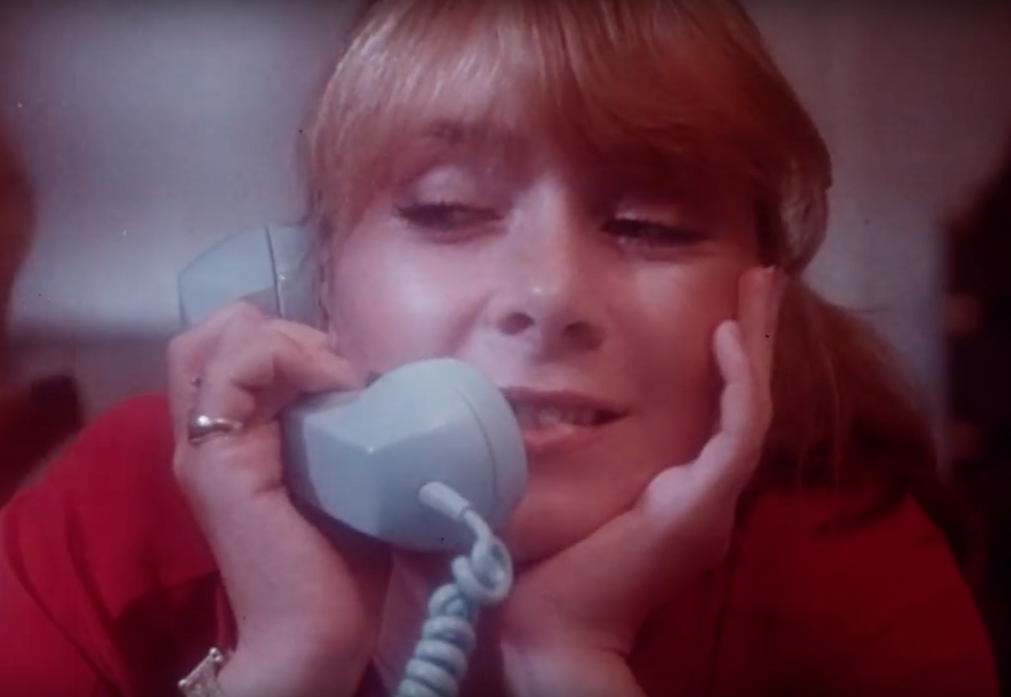
Anne-Marie Martin, Worst Written Film Grossing Over $100 Million co-winner.

Category	Nominees
Worst Picture	**Striptease (Columbia/Castle Rock)**
Worst Picture	Barb Wire (Gramercy)
Worst Picture	Ed (Universal)
Worst Picture	The Island of Dr. Moreau (New Line)
Worst Picture	The Stupids (New Line/Savoy)
Worst Actor	**Tom Arnold in Big Bully, Carpool and The Stupids as Rosco "Fang" Bigger, Franklin Laszlo and Stanley Stupid (respectively) (tie)**
Worst Actor	**Pauly Shore in Bio-Dome as Bud Macintosh (tie)**
Worst Actor	Keanu Reeves in Chain Reaction as Eddie Kasalivich
Worst Actor	Adam Sandler in Bulletproof and Happy Gilmore as Archie Moses and Happy Gilmore (respectively)
Worst Actor	Sylvester Stallone in Daylight as Kit Latura
Worst Actress	**Demi Moore in The Juror and Striptease as Annie Laird and Erin Grant (respectively)**
Worst Actress	Pamela Anderson in Barb Wire as Barbara "Barb Wire" Kopetski
Worst Actress	Whoopi Goldberg in Bogus, Eddie and Theodore Rex as Harriet Franklin, Edwina "Eddie" Franklin and Katie Coltrane (respectively)
Worst Actress	Melanie Griffith in Two Much as Betty Kerner
Worst Actress	Julia Roberts in Mary Reilly as Mary Reilly
Worst Supporting Actor	**Marlon Brando in The Island of Dr. Moreau as Dr. Moreau**
Worst Supporting Actor	Val Kilmer in The Ghost and the Darkness and The Island of Dr. Moreau as John Henry Patterson and Dr. Montgomery (respectively)
Worst Supporting Actor	Burt Reynolds in Striptease as Congressman David Dilbeck
Worst Supporting Actor	Steven Seagal in Executive Decision as Lt. Col. Austin Travis
Worst Supporting Actor	Quentin Tarantino in From Dusk till Dawn as Richie Gecko
Worst Supporting Actress	**Melanie Griffith in Mulholland Falls as Katherine Hoover**
Worst Supporting Actress	Faye Dunaway in The Chamber and Dunston Checks In as Lee Cayhall Bowen and Mrs. Elena Dubrow (respectively)
Worst Supporting Actress	Jami Gertz in Twister as Melissa Reeves
Worst Supporting Actress	Daryl Hannah in Two Much as Liz Kerner
Worst Supporting Actress	Teri Hatcher in Heaven's Prisoners and 2 Days in the Valley as Claudette Rocque and Becky Foxx (respectively)
Worst Screen Couple	**Demi Moore and Burt Reynolds in Striptease**
Worst Screen Couple	Pamela Anderson's "Impressive Enhancements" in Barb Wire
Worst Screen Couple	Beavis and Butt-head in Beavis and Butt-head Do America
Worst Screen Couple	Marlon Brando and "That Darn Dwarf" (Nelson de la Rosa) in The Island of Dr. Moreau
Worst Screen Couple	Matt LeBlanc and Ed (the mechanical monkey) in Ed
Worst Director	**Andrew Bergman for Striptease**
Worst Director	John Frankenheimer for The Island of Dr. Moreau
Worst Director	Stephen Frears for Mary Reilly
Worst Director	John Landis for The Stupids
Worst Director	Brian Levant for Jingle All the Way
Worst Screenplay	**Striptease, screenplay by Andrew Bergman, based on the novel by Carl Hiaasen**
Worst Screenplay	Barb Wire, screenplay by Chuck Pfarrer and Ilene Chaiken, story by Chaiken, based upon the characters appearing in the Dark Horse comic
Worst Screenplay	Ed, screenplay by David Mickey Evans, story by Ken Richards and Janus Cercone
Worst Screenplay	The Island of Dr. Moreau, screenplay by Richard Stanley and Ron Hutchinson, based on the novel by H. G. Wells
Worst Screenplay	The Stupids, written by Brent Forrester, based on characters created by James Marshall and Harry Allard
Worst New Star	**Pamela Anderson in Barb Wire as Barbara "Barb Wire" Kopetski**
Worst New Star	Beavis and Butt-Head in Beavis and Butt-Head Do America
Worst New Star	Ellen DeGeneres in Mr. Wrong as Martha Alston
Worst New Star	Friends cast members turned movie-star-wanna-be's (Jennifer Aniston in She's the One, Lisa Kudrow in Mother, Matt LeBlanc in Ed, and David Schwimmer in The Pallbearer)
Worst New Star	The new "serious" Sharon Stone in Diabolique and Last Dance as Nicole Horner and Cindy Liggett (respectively)
Worst Original Song	**"Pussy, Pussy, Pussy (Whose Kitty Cat Are You?)" from Striptease, written by Marvin Montgomery**
Worst Original Song	"Welcome to Planet Boom! (a.k.a. This Boom's for You)" from Barb Wire, written by Tommy Lee
Worst Original Song	"Whenever There Is Love (Love Theme from Daylight)" from Daylight, written by Bruce Roberts and Sam Roman
Worst Written Film Grossing Over $100 Million	**Twister (Warner Bros.), written by Michael Crichton & Anne-Marie Martin**
Worst Written Film Grossing Over $100 Million	The Hunchback of Notre Dame (Disney), animation screenplay by Tab Murphy, Irene Mecchi, Bob Tzudiker & Noni White
Worst Written Film Grossing Over $100 Million	Independence Day (20th Century Fox), written by Dean Devlin and Roland Emmerich
Worst Written Film Grossing Over $100 Million	Mission: Impossible (Paramount), based on the television series created by Bruce Geller, story by David Koepp and Steven Zaillian, screenplay by Koepp and Robert Towne
Worst Written Film Grossing Over $100 Million	A Time to Kill (Warner Bros.), screenplay by Akiva Goldsman, based on the novel by John Grisham

== Films with multiple nominations ==
These films received multiple nominations:

Nominations	Films
7	Striptease
6	Barb Wire
6	The Island of Dr. Moreau
4	Ed
4	The Stupids
2	Beavis and Butt-head Do America
2	Daylight
2	Mary Reilly
2	Twister
2	Two Much

== See also ==
- 1996 in film
- 69th Academy Awards
- 50th British Academy Film Awards
- 54th Golden Globe Awards
- 3rd Screen Actors Guild Awards
