= Bio-Dome =

1996 comedy film directed by Jason Bloom

- Theatrical release poster
- Directed by: Jason Bloom
- Screenplay by: Kip Koenig; Scott Marcano
- Story by: Adam Leff; Mitchell Peck; Jason Blumenthal
- Produced by: Bradley Jenkel; Brad Krevoy; Steven Stabler
- Starring: Pauly Shore; Stephen Baldwin; William Atherton; Joey Adams; Kylie Minogue
- Narrated by: Rodger Bumpass
- Cinematography: Phedon Papamichael Jr.
- Edited by: Christopher Greenbury
- Music by: Andrew Gross
- Production companies: Metro-Goldwyn-Mayer Pictures; Motion Picture Corporation of America
- Distributed by: MGM/UA Distribution Co.
- Release date: January 12, 1996
- Running time: 95 minutes
- Country: United States
- Language: English
- Budget: $8.5 million
- Box office: $13.4 million

Bio-Dome is a 1996 American comedy film directed by Jason Bloom. It was produced by Motion Picture Corporation of America on a budget of $8.5 million and was distributed theatrically by Metro-Goldwyn-Mayer Pictures.

The film was inspired by the real life project Biosphere 2. The plot revolves around two clumsy, dim-witted slackers who, while on a road trip, look for a bathroom in what they believe is a shopping mall. The shopping mall turns out to be a "bio-dome", a form of closed ecological system, in which five scientists are about to be hermetically sealed for a year. The film has themes of environmentalism, combined with drug use, sexual innuendo, and toilet humor.

The film stars Pauly Shore and Stephen Baldwin, and has cameo appearances by celebrities such as Roger Clinton and Patricia Hearst. Jack Black and Kyle Gass first came to global attention in Bio-Dome, performing together as Tenacious D on-screen for the first time.

The film was financed by a loan from Coutts & Co. to the Motion Picture Corporation of America. It grossed $13.4 million at the box office in North America, and was panned by critics, gaining a record low score of 1/100 on Metacritic. Bio-Dome is often considered to be one of the worst films ever made.

In 2013, Stephen Baldwin said he was in talks with Pauly Shore about making a sequel to the film revolving around the children of Bud and Doyle, their characters.

== Plot ==
Best friends Bud "Squirrel" Macintosh and Doyle "Stubs" Johnson live together in Arizona, but their environmentalist girlfriends, Jen and Monique, dump them due to their immaturity. Driving home, they pass by the Bio-Dome, where scientist Dr. Noah Faulkner is about to seal his team in for a year without outside contact. Mistaking the Bio-Dome for a mall, Bud and Doyle go inside to use the bathroom, only to be sealed in with the scientists. Dr. Leaky, the project's investor, discovers them and demands their removal, but Dr. Faulkner refuses, claiming it would destroy the purpose of the experiment, so Bud and Doyle remain. They continue their antics, harming themselves and destroying many of the scientists' projects. The scientists plead to Dr. Faulkner, but he only relents after the two find a secret stash of junk food and experiment with laughing gas. The two are then banished to the desert environment section and, after three days of isolation, discover a key in the lock of one of the windows, which opens a back door, and they escape the Bio-Dome.

As Bud and Doyle are receiving a pizza delivery at the dome, they learn that Jen and Monique are attending an environmental party with other men, so they decide to outdo the party and hold one inside the Bio-Dome to win them back. The party backfires, throwing the experiment into chaos, and Jen and Monique disavow the boys. The scientists prepare to exit out of the desert through the door, but, realizing their idiotic actions, Bud and Doyle intervene and demand that they all stay and restore the dome to full health, with Doyle swallowing the key as a last resort. The group subdues the situation and begins to fix the dome together, while the boys and the scientists bond as a team, and Bud and Doyle's efforts in restoring the dome soon draw a large group of fans and supporters, including Monique and Jen. Meanwhile, Dr. Faulkner, who had disappeared the night of the party, has gone insane and is starting plans to blow up the dome with IEDs inside of coconuts.

After several months pass and Earth Day approaches, Bud, Doyle, and the team restore the dome, but on the night before the doors reopen, Bud and Doyle discover Dr. Faulkner, hoping to apologize to him and make amends. He tells the two that he is rigging pyrotechnics for the door-opening ceremony and gets them to help plant the items, unaware they are really bombs. Once Bud and Doyle are left alone with the bombs, they goof off with one of the coconuts and discover their dangerous nature. They alert the others and try to exit the dome early, but the door cannot be opened until the clock hits zero, when the bombs will detonate. Bud and Doyle run back into the dome to find Dr. Faulkner and get him to deactivate the bombs. After a chase and struggle, they knock him out and use a remote to disable the coconuts.

With the Bio-Dome experiment complete, the team gets ready to exit the now-open door, but Dr. Faulkner returns with one last coconut bomb. He trips, and the bomb detonates at the entrance. Bud, Doyle, Jen, and Monique bid farewell to the Bio-Dome scientists and drive off, where Doyle again has to use the bathroom and the car is seen driving toward a mysterious nuclear power plant. Dr. Faulkner, meanwhile, has escaped the dome through the desert window door, having retrieved the key Doyle swallowed, and flees through the desert pursued by police.

== Cast ==
- Pauly Shore as Bud "Squirrel" Macintosh
  - Adam Weisman as young Bud
- Stephen Baldwin as Doyle "Stubs" Johnson
  - Robbie Thibault Jr. as young Doyle
- William Atherton as Dr. Noah Faulkner
- Joey Adams as Monique
- Teresa Hill as Jen
- Henry Gibson as Dr. William Leaky
- Kylie Minogue as Dr. Petra von Kant
- Kevin West as T. C. Romulus
- Denise Dowse as Dr. Olivia Biggs
- Dara Tomanovich as Mimi Simkins
- Rose McGowan as Denise
- Taylor Negron as Russell
- Patricia Hearst as Mrs. Johnson
- Jeremy Jordan as Trent
- Trevor St. John as Parker
- Channon Roe as Roach
- Roger Clinton as Professor Bloom
- Butch McCain as reporter Joachim West
- Ben McCain as news anchor Aries West
- Jack Black and Kyle Gass as Tenacious D
- Phil LaMarr and Paul Eiding as Assistants
- Phil Proctor as Axl
- Rodger Bumpass as Narrator

== Real-life inspiration ==
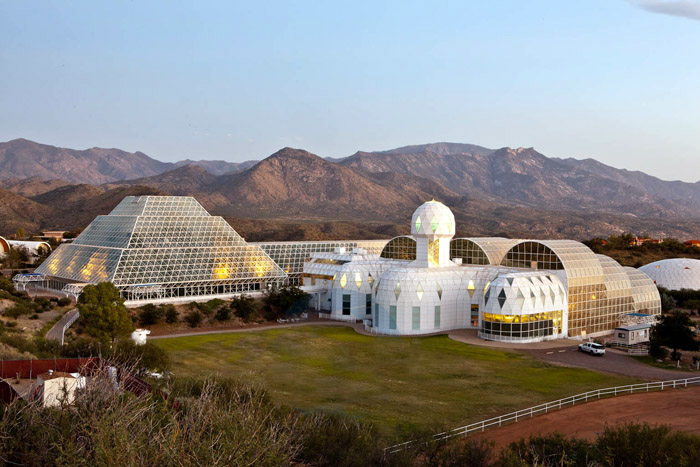
Biosphere 2 in Oracle, Arizona

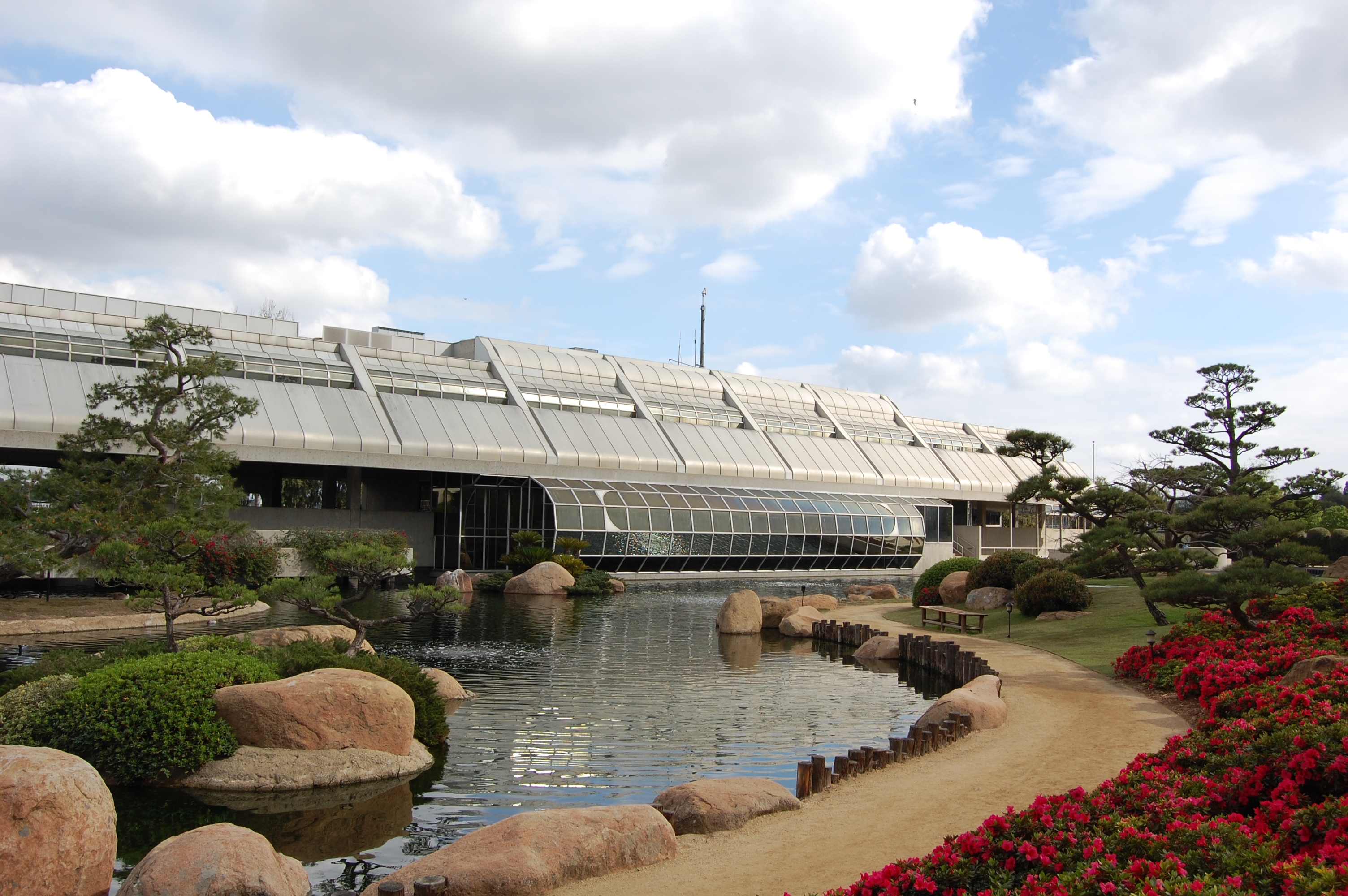
Tillman Water Reclamation Plant in Van Nuys, California, where Bio-Dome was filmed

Biosphere 2, which closely resembles the film's "Bio-Dome", opened in Oracle, Arizona, in 1991. The first "mission" saw eight scientists sealed inside the facility between 1991 and 1993 as part of an experiment to see how feasibly they could live within a closed system. Criticism of the experiment said that it was not scientifically valid as it could not be repeated, and that the group, who had originated from the Theater of All Possibilities, were acting along the lines of a cult.

The scientists themselves staged a comedic play entitled The Wrong Stuff (a reference to The Right Stuff) in the days before they were sealed in, depicting an exaggerated parody of what they foresaw could go wrong, and effectively foreshadowing the filming of Bio-Dome before the experiment even began.

Once the scientists were sealed inside, the experiment quickly descended into a fiasco due to "interpersonal conflicts and scientific controversies" including oxygen and food shortages, the controversial use of a carbon dioxide scrubber and arguments among the group that had them barely on speaking terms. Initially positive media coverage quickly turned against Biosphere 2 as one escalating scandal followed another. This was later the subject of the 2020 documentary Spaceship Earth.

The producers of Bio-Dome originally intended to film in the real Biosphere 2, but permission was denied by Steve Bannon who had become involved in managing the facility. "We're not in the movie business", Bannon told the producers, "and we're focused on a very big effort here to turn around and legitimize the science and education program." Instead, Tillman Water Reclamation Plant in Van Nuys, California, was used.

While the film adds the element of two unqualified people finding themselves accidentally sealed in the dome and exaggerates the story for comedic purposes, many elements of the plot - food shortages, a drop in oxygen levels, a wealthy benefactor, the grandiose opening ceremony, arguments between the crew and kissing the glass as visitors drop in from outside - are based in fact. The film's director, Jason Bloom, even said he had decided to depict the scientists and the experiment as "much more legitimate and focused on real science" than they were in real life.

Two of the original Biosphere 2 scientists - Jane Poynter and Taber MacCallum - later saw Bio-Dome and enjoyed it, saying they "laughed a lot" and always thought a movie would be made about the experience but expected something along the lines of Total Recall instead of a comedy. However, Biosphere 2's then-manager Wallace Smith Broecker was offended by the film and called it "a step in the wrong direction" as the facility was trying to distance itself from its past and develop a reputation as a legitimate scientific institution.

== Reception ==
=== Critical reception ===
On Rotten Tomatoes, the film has an approval rating of 4% based on reviews from 27 critics. The critical consensus reads: "Like its two obnoxious protagonists, this dreadfully unfunny Pauly Shore vehicle should remain separated from society." On Metacritic, it has a score of 1 out of 100 based on reviews from 10 critics, indicating "overwhelming dislike", being tied for the lowest on the website. Audiences surveyed by CinemaScore gave the film a grade B− on scale of A to F.

Leonard Klady of Variety wrote: "It's not by any means inspired madness. Neither the script nor direction lives up to the concept, and the picture evolves into a 'Bio'-degradable hash rather than a zany sendup of potent issues and serious intents gone awry." Owen Gleiberman of Entertainment Weekly gave the film a grade F, saying "Even with the low expectations any reasonable viewer brings to a Shore flick, this rates only stupid-plus." Stephen Holden of The New York Times called it "inept in almost every respect". Travis Clark of Business Insider deemed it the "3rd worst movie of all time" according to critical and audience reactions.

=== Box office ===
Bio-Dome grossed $13.4 million in North America, against an estimated production budget of $8.5 million. MGM spent $10 million on marketing.

=== Accolades ===
At the 1996 Golden Raspberry Awards, Shore co-won a Razzie Award for Worst Actor for his work in the film, tied with Tom Arnold for that actor's performances in Big Bully, Carpool, and The Stupids. At the 1996 Stinkers Bad Movie Awards, the movie won two of the movies' three nominations: Worst On-Screen Hairstyle for Stephen Baldwin and Most Painfully Unfunny Comedy. Shore was also nominated for Worst Actor, but lost to Tom Arnold for his acting in those same three movies.

== In media ==
The film is mentioned in the 1999 "Weird Al" Yankovic song "Albuquerque", where it is the in-flight movie on the narrator's airplane.

== Potential sequel ==
On December 18, 2013, Stephen Baldwin said in an interview with Mancow Muller that he was in talks with Pauly Shore about making a sequel to the film revolving around the children of their characters Bud and Doyle. Baldwin further stated that he gets recognized more for his role in Bio-Dome than any other film. In a 2017 interview, he reiterated his desire to make a sequel, saying that Shore was interested and he has funding, but is seeking studio approval.

== See also ==
- MARS-500 – Psychosocial isolation experiment in spaceflight research
- Montreal Biodome – Sporting arena in Montreal, Quebec
