= Golden Raspberry Award for Worst Actor =

Award presented at the annual Golden Raspberry Awards

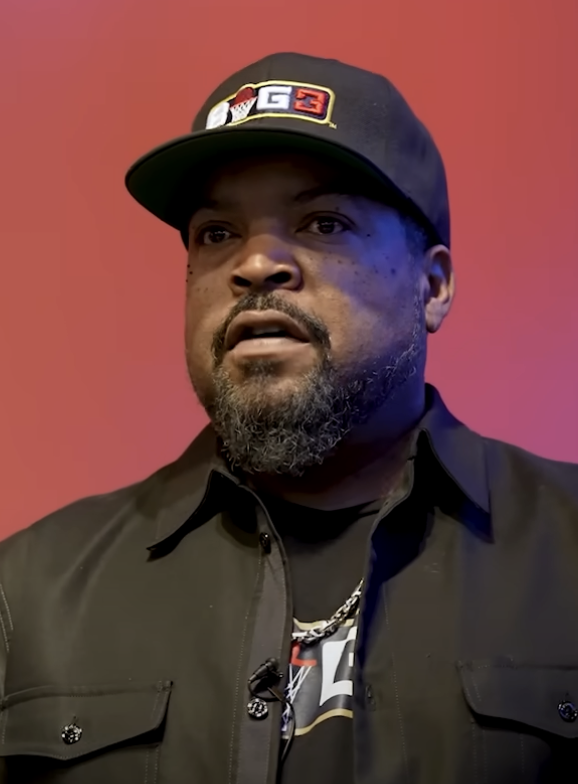
- The 2025 Winner: Ice Cube
- Awarded for: Worst in film
- Country: United States
- Presented by: Golden Raspberry Award Foundation
- First award: Neil Diamond, The Jazz Singer (1980)
- Currently held by: Ice Cube, War of the Worlds (2025)
- Website: www.razzies.com

The Razzie Award for Worst Actor is an award presented at the annual Golden Raspberry Awards to the worst actor of the previous year. The following is a list of nominees and recipients of that award, along with the film(s) for which they were nominated.

The category of "actor" has expanded to include the subjects of documentary films; this process has been criticized. Six winners of this award have come from appearances as themselves: George W. Bush, The Jonas Brothers, Dinesh D'Souza, Donald Trump, Mike Lindell and LeBron James. Five of these came from appearances in documentaries; LeBron James' came from Space Jam: A New Legacy.

== Winners and nominees ==
=== 1980s ===
Year	Actor	Film	Character
1980 (1st)	Neil Diamond	The Jazz Singer	Yussel Rabinovitch
1980 (1st)	Michael Beck	Xanadu	Sonny Malone
1980 (1st)	Robert Blake	Coast to Coast	Charles Callahan
1980 (1st)	Michael Caine	Dressed to Kill	Dr. Robert Elliott
1980 (1st)	Michael Caine	The Island	Blair Maynard
1980 (1st)	Kirk Douglas	Saturn 3	Adam
1980 (1st)	Richard Dreyfuss	The Competition	Paul Dietrich
1980 (1st)	Anthony Hopkins	A Change of Seasons	Adam Evans
1980 (1st)	Bruce Jenner	Can't Stop the Music	Ron White
1980 (1st)	Sam J. Jones	Flash Gordon	Flash Gordon
1981 (2nd)	Klinton Spilsbury	The Legend of the Lone Ranger	John Reid / The Lone Ranger
1981 (2nd)	Gary Coleman	On the Right Track	Lester
1981 (2nd)	Bruce Dern	Tattoo	Karl Kinsky
1981 (2nd)	Richard Harris	Tarzan, the Ape Man	James Parker
1981 (2nd)	Kris Kristofferson	Heaven's Gate	James Averill
1981 (2nd)	Kris Kristofferson	Rollover	Hubbell Smith
1982 (3rd)	Laurence Olivier	Inchon	Douglas MacArthur
1982 (3rd)	Willie Aames	Paradise	David
1982 (3rd)	Willie Aames	Zapped!	Peyton Nichols
1982 (3rd)	Christopher Atkins	The Pirate Movie	Frederic
1982 (3rd)	Luciano Pavarotti	Yes, Giorgio	Giorgio Fini
1982 (3rd)	Arnold Schwarzenegger	Conan the Barbarian	Conan
1983 (4th)	Christopher Atkins	A Night in Heaven	Rick Monroe
1983 (4th)	Lloyd Bochner	The Lonely Lady	Walter Thornton
1983 (4th)	Lou Ferrigno	Hercules	Hercules
1983 (4th)	Barbra Streisand (in drag)	Yentl	"Anshel" Mendel
1983 (4th)	John Travolta	Staying Alive	Tony Manero
1983 (4th)	John Travolta	Two of a Kind	Zack Melon
1984 (5th)	Sylvester Stallone	Rhinestone	Nick Martinelli
1984 (5th)	Lorenzo Lamas	Body Rock	Chilly
1984 (5th)	Jerry Lewis	Slapstick of Another Kind	Wilbur Swain / Caleb Swain
1984 (5th)	Peter O'Toole	Supergirl	Zaltar
1984 (5th)	Burt Reynolds	Cannonball Run II	J.J. McClure
1984 (5th)	Burt Reynolds	City Heat	Mike Murphy
1985 (6th)	Sylvester Stallone	Rambo: First Blood Part II	John Rambo
1985 (6th)	Sylvester Stallone	Rocky IV	Rocky Balboa
1985 (6th)	Divine	Lust in the Dust	Rosie Velez
1985 (6th)	Richard Gere	King David	David
1985 (6th)	Al Pacino	Revolution	Tom Dobb
1985 (6th)	John Travolta	Perfect	Adam Lawrence
1986 (7th)	Prince	Under the Cherry Moon	Christopher Tracy
1986 (7th)	Emilio Estevez	Maximum Overdrive	Bill Robinson
1986 (7th)	Judd Nelson	Blue City	Billy Turner
1986 (7th)	Sean Penn	Shanghai Surprise	Glendon Wasey
1986 (7th)	Sylvester Stallone	Cobra	Marion 'Cobra' Cobretti
1987 (8th)	Bill Cosby	Leonard Part 6	Leonard Parker
1987 (8th)	"Bruce the Shark"	Jaws: The Revenge	A shark
1987 (8th)	Judd Nelson	From the Hip	Robin 'Stormy' Weathers
1987 (8th)	Ryan O'Neal	Tough Guys Don't Dance	Tim Madden
1987 (8th)	Sylvester Stallone	Over the Top	Lincoln Hawk
1988 (9th)	Sylvester Stallone	Rambo III	John Rambo
1988 (9th)	Tom Cruise	Cocktail	Brian Flanagan
1988 (9th)	Bobcat Goldthwait	Hot to Trot	Fred Chaney
1988 (9th)	Jackie Mason	Caddyshack II	Jack Hartounian
1988 (9th)	Burt Reynolds	Rent-a-Cop	Tony Church
1988 (9th)	Burt Reynolds	Switching Channels	John L. Sullivan IV
1989 (10th)	William Shatner	Star Trek V: The Final Frontier	James T. Kirk
1989 (10th)	Tony Danza	She's Out of Control	Doug Simpson
1989 (10th)	Ralph Macchio	The Karate Kid Part III	Daniel LaRusso
1989 (10th)	Sylvester Stallone	Lock Up	Frank Leone
1989 (10th)	Sylvester Stallone	Tango & Cash	Ray Tango
1989 (10th)	Patrick Swayze	Next of Kin	Truman Gates
1989 (10th)	Patrick Swayze	Road House	James Dalton

=== 1990s ===
Year	Actor	Film	Character
1990 (11th)	Andrew Dice Clay	The Adventures of Ford Fairlane	Ford Fairlane
1990 (11th)	Prince	Graffiti Bridge	The Kid
1990 (11th)	Mickey Rourke	Desperate Hours	Michael Bosworth
1990 (11th)	Mickey Rourke	Wild Orchid	James Wheeler
1990 (11th)	George C. Scott	The Exorcist III	Lt. William Kinderman
1990 (11th)	Sylvester Stallone	Rocky V	Rocky Balboa
1991 (12th)	Kevin Costner	Robin Hood: Prince of Thieves	Robin Hood
1991 (12th)	Andrew Dice Clay	Dice Rules	Himself
1991 (12th)	Sylvester Stallone	Oscar	Angelo "Snaps" Provolone
1991 (12th)	Vanilla Ice	Cool as Ice	Johnny Van Owen
1991 (12th)	Bruce Willis	Hudson Hawk	Eddie "Hudson Hawk" Hawkins
1992 (13th)	Sylvester Stallone	Stop! Or My Mom Will Shoot	Sgt. Joe Bomowski
1992 (13th)	Kevin Costner	The Bodyguard	Frank Farmer
1992 (13th)	Michael Douglas	Basic Instinct	Det. Nick Curran
1992 (13th)	Michael Douglas	Shining Through	Ed Leland
1992 (13th)	Jack Nicholson	Hoffa	Jimmy Hoffa
1992 (13th)	Jack Nicholson	Man Trouble	Harry Bliss
1992 (13th)	Tom Selleck	Folks!	Jon Aldrich
1993 (14th)	Burt Reynolds	Cop and a Half	Det. Nick McKenna
1993 (14th)	William Baldwin	Sliver	Zeke Hawkins
1993 (14th)	Willem Dafoe	Body of Evidence	Frank Dulaney
1993 (14th)	Robert Redford	Indecent Proposal	John Gage
1993 (14th)	Arnold Schwarzenegger	Last Action Hero	Jack Slater
1994 (15th)	Kevin Costner	Wyatt Earp	Wyatt Earp
1994 (15th)	Macaulay Culkin	Getting Even with Dad	Timmy Gleason
1994 (15th)	Macaulay Culkin	The Pagemaster	Richard Tyler
1994 (15th)	Macaulay Culkin	Richie Rich	Richie Rich
1994 (15th)	Steven Seagal	On Deadly Ground	Forrest Taft
1994 (15th)	Sylvester Stallone	The Specialist	Ray Quick
1994 (15th)	Bruce Willis	Color of Night	Dr. Bill Capa
1994 (15th)	Bruce Willis	North	Narrator / Easter Bunny / Gabby / Tourist / Sleigh Driver / Joey Fingers / FedEx Driver
1995 (16th)	Pauly Shore	Jury Duty	Tommy Collins
1995 (16th)	Kevin Costner	Waterworld	The Mariner
1995 (16th)	Kyle MacLachlan	Showgirls	Zack Carey
1995 (16th)	Keanu Reeves	Johnny Mnemonic	Johnny Mnemonic
1995 (16th)	Keanu Reeves	A Walk in the Clouds	Paul Sutton
1995 (16th)	Sylvester Stallone	Assassins	Robert Rath
1995 (16th)	Sylvester Stallone	Judge Dredd	Judge Joseph Dredd
1996 (17th)	Tom Arnold (tie)	Big Bully	Rosco "Fang" Bigger
1996 (17th)	Tom Arnold (tie)	Carpool	Franklin Laszlo
1996 (17th)	Tom Arnold (tie)	The Stupids	Stanley Stupid
1996 (17th)	Pauly Shore (tie)	Bio-Dome	Bud Macintosh
1996 (17th)	Keanu Reeves	Chain Reaction	Eddie Kasalivich
1996 (17th)	Adam Sandler	Bulletproof	Archie Moses
1996 (17th)	Adam Sandler	Happy Gilmore	Happy Gilmore
1996 (17th)	Sylvester Stallone	Daylight	Kit Latura
1997 (18th)	Kevin Costner	The Postman	The Postman (Gordon Krantz)
1997 (18th)	Val Kilmer	The Saint	Simon Templar
1997 (18th)	Shaquille O'Neal	Steel	John Henry Irons / Steel
1997 (18th)	Steven Seagal	Fire Down Below	Jack Taggart
1997 (18th)	Jon Voight	Anaconda	Paul Sarone
1998 (19th)	Bruce Willis	Armageddon	Harry Stamper
1998 (19th)	Bruce Willis	Mercury Rising	Art Jeffries
1998 (19th)	Bruce Willis	The Siege	Gen. William Devereaux
1998 (19th)	Ralph Fiennes	The Avengers	John Steed
1998 (19th)	Ryan O'Neal	An Alan Smithee Film: Burn Hollywood Burn	James Edmunds
1998 (19th)	Ryan Phillippe	54	Shane O'Shea
1998 (19th)	Adam Sandler	The Waterboy	Bobby Boucher
1999 (20th)	Adam Sandler	Big Daddy	Sonny Koufax
1999 (20th)	Kevin Costner	For Love of the Game	Billy Chapel
1999 (20th)	Kevin Costner	Message in a Bottle	Garret Blake
1999 (20th)	Kevin Kline	Wild Wild West	Artemus Gordon
1999 (20th)	Arnold Schwarzenegger	End of Days	Jericho Cane
1999 (20th)	Robin Williams	Bicentennial Man	Andrew Martin
1999 (20th)	Robin Williams	Jakob the Liar	Jakob Heym

=== 2000s ===
Year	Actor	Film	Character
2000 (21st)	John Travolta	Battlefield Earth	Terl
2000 (21st)	John Travolta	Lucky Numbers	Russ Richards
2000 (21st)	Leonardo DiCaprio	The Beach	Richard
2000 (21st)	Adam Sandler	Little Nicky	Nicky
2000 (21st)	Arnold Schwarzenegger	The 6th Day	Adam Gibson
2000 (21st)	Sylvester Stallone	Get Carter	Jack Carter
2001 (22nd)	Tom Green	Freddy Got Fingered	Gordon "Gord" Brody
2001 (22nd)	Ben Affleck	Pearl Harbor	Capt. Rafe McCawley
2001 (22nd)	Kevin Costner	3000 Miles to Graceland	Thomas J. Murphy
2001 (22nd)	Keanu Reeves	Hardball	Conor O'Neill
2001 (22nd)	Keanu Reeves	Sweet November	Nelson Moss
2001 (22nd)	John Travolta	Domestic Disturbance	Frank Morrison
2001 (22nd)	John Travolta	Swordfish	Gabriel Shear
2002 (23rd)	Roberto Benigni (dubbed Godzilla-style by Breckin Meyer)	Pinocchio	Pinocchio
2002 (23rd)	Adriano Giannini	Swept Away	Giuseppe
2002 (23rd)	Eddie Murphy	The Adventures of Pluto Nash	Pluto Nash / Rex Crater
2002 (23rd)	Eddie Murphy	I Spy	Kelly Robinson
2002 (23rd)	Eddie Murphy	Showtime	Off. Trey Sellars
2002 (23rd)	Adam Sandler	Eight Crazy Nights	Davey Stone / Whitey Duvall / Eleanore Duvall / Deer
2002 (23rd)	Adam Sandler	Mr. Deeds	Longfellow Deeds
2002 (23rd)	Steven Seagal	Half Past Dead	Sasha Petrosevitch
2003 (24th)	Ben Affleck	Daredevil	Matt Murdock / Daredevil
2003 (24th)	Ben Affleck	Gigli	Larry Gigli
2003 (24th)	Ben Affleck	Paycheck	Michael Jennings
2003 (24th)	Cuba Gooding Jr.	Boat Trip	Jerry Robinson
2003 (24th)	Cuba Gooding Jr.	The Fighting Temptations	Darrin Hill
2003 (24th)	Cuba Gooding Jr.	Radio	James Robert "Radio" Kennedy
2003 (24th)	Justin Guarini	From Justin to Kelly	Justin Bell
2003 (24th)	Ashton Kutcher	Cheaper by the Dozen	Hank
2003 (24th)	Ashton Kutcher	Just Married	Tom Leezak
2003 (24th)	Ashton Kutcher	My Boss's Daughter	Tom Stansfield
2003 (24th)	Mike Myers	The Cat in the Hat	The Cat in the Hat
2004 (25th)	George W. Bush (Note: Nomination is for a documentary appearance, not an acting performance.)	Fahrenheit 9/11	Himself
2004 (25th)	Ben Affleck	Jersey Girl	Oliver "Ollie" Trinke
2004 (25th)	Ben Affleck	Surviving Christmas	Drew Latham
2004 (25th)	Vin Diesel	The Chronicles of Riddick	Riddick
2004 (25th)	Colin Farrell	Alexander	Alexander the Great
2004 (25th)	Ben Stiller	Along Came Polly	Reuben Feffer
2004 (25th)	Ben Stiller	Anchorman: The Legend of Ron Burgundy	Arturo Mendez
2004 (25th)	Ben Stiller	DodgeBall: A True Underdog Story	White Goodman
2004 (25th)	Ben Stiller	Envy	Tim Dingman
2004 (25th)	Ben Stiller	Starsky & Hutch	David Starsky
2005 (26th)	Rob Schneider	Deuce Bigalow: European Gigolo	Deuce Bigalow
2005 (26th)	Tom Cruise	War of the Worlds	Ray Ferrier
2005 (26th)	Will Ferrell	Bewitched	Jack Wyatt / Darrin Stephens
2005 (26th)	Will Ferrell	Kicking & Screaming	Phil Weston
2005 (26th)	Dwayne Johnson	Doom	Asher "Sarge" Mahonin
2005 (26th)	Jamie Kennedy	Son of the Mask	Tim Avery
2006 (27th)	Marlon Wayans & Shawn Wayans	Little Man	Calvin Simms and Darryl Edwards
2006 (27th)	Tim Allen	The Santa Clause 3: The Escape Clause	Santa Claus / Scott Calvin
2006 (27th)	Tim Allen	The Shaggy Dog	Dave Douglas
2006 (27th)	Tim Allen	Zoom	Jack Shepard / Captain Zoom
2006 (27th)	Nicolas Cage	The Wicker Man	Edward Malus
2006 (27th)	Larry the Cable Guy	Larry the Cable Guy: Health Inspector	Larry
2006 (27th)	Rob Schneider	The Benchwarmers	Gus Matthews
2006 (27th)	Rob Schneider	Little Man	D-Rex
2007 (28th)	Eddie Murphy	Norbit	Norbit Albert Rice
2007 (28th)	Nicolas Cage	Ghost Rider	Johnny Blaze / Ghost Rider
2007 (28th)	Nicolas Cage	National Treasure: Book of Secrets	Benjamin Franklin Gates
2007 (28th)	Nicolas Cage	Next	Cris Johnson
2007 (28th)	Jim Carrey	The Number 23	Walter Sparrow / Det. Fingerling
2007 (28th)	Cuba Gooding Jr.	Daddy Day Camp	Charlie Hinton
2007 (28th)	Cuba Gooding Jr.	Norbit	Deion Hughes
2007 (28th)	Adam Sandler	I Now Pronounce You Chuck & Larry	Chuck Levine
2008 (29th)	Mike Myers	The Love Guru	Guru Maurice Pitka
2008 (29th)	Larry the Cable Guy	Witless Protection	Larry Stalder
2008 (29th)	Eddie Murphy	Meet Dave	Dave Ming Cheng / The Captain
2008 (29th)	Al Pacino	88 Minutes	Dr. Jack Gramm
2008 (29th)	Al Pacino	Righteous Kill	Det. David "Rooster" Fisk
2008 (29th)	Mark Wahlberg	The Happening	Elliot Moore
2008 (29th)	Mark Wahlberg	Max Payne	Max Payne
2009 (30th)	Jonas Brothers (Note: Consisting of Joe Jonas, Kevin Jonas and Nick Jonas)	Jonas Brothers: The 3D Concert Experience	Themselves
2009 (30th)	Will Ferrell	Land of the Lost	Dr. Rick Marshall
2009 (30th)	Steve Martin	The Pink Panther 2	Jacques Clouseau
2009 (30th)	Eddie Murphy	Imagine That	Evan Danielson
2009 (30th)	John Travolta	Old Dogs	Charlie Reed

=== 2010s ===
Year	Actor	Film	Character
2010 (31st)	Ashton Kutcher	Killers	Spencer Aimes
2010 (31st)	Ashton Kutcher	Valentine's Day	Reed Bennett
2010 (31st)	Jack Black	Gulliver's Travels	Lemuel Gulliver
2010 (31st)	Gerard Butler	The Bounty Hunter	Milo Boyd
2010 (31st)	Taylor Lautner	The Twilight Saga: Eclipse	Jacob Black
2010 (31st)	Taylor Lautner	Valentine's Day	Willy Harrington
2010 (31st)	Robert Pattinson	Remember Me	Tyler Hawkins
2010 (31st)	Robert Pattinson	The Twilight Saga: Eclipse	Edward Cullen
2011 (32nd)	Adam Sandler	Jack and Jill	Jack Sadelstein
2011 (32nd)	Adam Sandler	Just Go with It	Dr. Danny Maccabee
2011 (32nd)	Russell Brand	Arthur	Arthur Bach
2011 (32nd)	Nicolas Cage	Drive Angry	Milton
2011 (32nd)	Nicolas Cage	Season of the Witch	Behmen von Bleibruck
2011 (32nd)	Nicolas Cage	Trespass	Kyle Miller
2011 (32nd)	Taylor Lautner	Abduction	Nathan Harper
2011 (32nd)	Taylor Lautner	The Twilight Saga: Breaking Dawn – Part 1	Jacob Black
2011 (32nd)	Nick Swardson	Bucky Larson: Born to Be a Star	Bucky Larson
2012 (33rd)	Adam Sandler	That's My Boy	Donny Berger
2012 (33rd)	Nicolas Cage	Ghost Rider: Spirit of Vengeance	Johnny Blaze / Ghost Rider
2012 (33rd)	Nicolas Cage	Seeking Justice	Will Gerard
2012 (33rd)	Eddie Murphy	A Thousand Words	Jack McCall
2012 (33rd)	Robert Pattinson	The Twilight Saga: Breaking Dawn – Part 2	Edward Cullen
2012 (33rd)	Tyler Perry	Alex Cross	Alex Cross
2012 (33rd)	Tyler Perry	Good Deeds	Wesley Deeds
2013 (34th)	Jaden Smith	After Earth	Kitai Raige
2013 (34th)	Johnny Depp	The Lone Ranger	Tonto
2013 (34th)	Ashton Kutcher	Jobs	Steve Jobs
2013 (34th)	Adam Sandler	Grown Ups 2	Lenny Feder
2013 (34th)	Sylvester Stallone	Bullet to the Head	James Bonomo
2013 (34th)	Sylvester Stallone	Escape Plan	Ray Breslin
2013 (34th)	Sylvester Stallone	Grudge Match	Henry 'Razor' Sharp
2014 (35th)	Kirk Cameron	Saving Christmas	Kirk
2014 (35th)	Nicolas Cage	Left Behind	Rayford Steele
2014 (35th)	Kellan Lutz	The Legend of Hercules	Hercules
2014 (35th)	Seth MacFarlane	A Million Ways to Die in the West	Albert Stark
2014 (35th)	Adam Sandler	Blended	Jim Friedman
2015 (36th)	Jamie Dornan	Fifty Shades of Grey	Christian Grey
2015 (36th)	Johnny Depp	Mortdecai	Charlie Mortdecai
2015 (36th)	Kevin James	Paul Blart: Mall Cop 2	Paul Blart
2015 (36th)	Adam Sandler	The Cobbler	Max Simkin
2015 (36th)	Adam Sandler	Pixels	Sam Brenner
2015 (36th)	Channing Tatum	Jupiter Ascending	Caine Wise
2016 (37th)	Dinesh D'Souza	Hillary's America: The Secret History of the Democratic Party	Himself
2016 (37th)	Ben Affleck	Batman v Superman: Dawn of Justice	Bruce Wayne / Batman
2016 (37th)	Gerard Butler	Gods of Egypt	Set
2016 (37th)	Gerard Butler	London Has Fallen	Mike Banning
2016 (37th)	Henry Cavill	Batman v Superman: Dawn of Justice	Clark Kent / Superman
2016 (37th)	Robert De Niro	Dirty Grandpa	Richard "Dick" Kelly
2016 (37th)	Ben Stiller	Zoolander 2	Derek Zoolander
2017 (38th)	Tom Cruise	The Mummy	Nick Morton
2017 (38th)	Johnny Depp	Pirates of the Caribbean: Dead Men Tell No Tales	Jack Sparrow
2017 (38th)	Jamie Dornan	Fifty Shades Darker	Christian Grey
2017 (38th)	Zac Efron	Baywatch	Matt Brody
2017 (38th)	Mark Wahlberg	Daddy's Home 2	Dusty Mayron
2017 (38th)	Mark Wahlberg	Transformers: The Last Knight	Cade Yeager
2018 (39th)	Donald Trump	Death of a Nation	Himself
2018 (39th)	Donald Trump	Fahrenheit 11/9	Himself
2018 (39th)	Johnny Depp	Sherlock Gnomes	Sherlock Gnomes
2018 (39th)	Will Ferrell	Holmes & Watson	Sherlock Holmes
2018 (39th)	John Travolta	Gotti	John Gotti
2018 (39th)	Bruce Willis	Death Wish	Paul Kersey
2019 (40th)	John Travolta	The Fanatic	Moose
2019 (40th)	John Travolta	Trading Paint	Sam Munroe
2019 (40th)	James Franco	Zeroville	Vikar
2019 (40th)	David Harbour	Hellboy	Hellboy / Anung Un Rama
2019 (40th)	Matthew McConaughey	Serenity	Baker Dill
2019 (40th)	Sylvester Stallone	Rambo: Last Blood	John Rambo

=== 2020s ===
Year	Actor	Film	Character
2020 (41st)	Mike Lindell (The "My Pillow Guy")	Absolute Proof	Himself
2020 (41st)	Robert Downey Jr.	Dolittle	Dr. John Dolittle
2020 (41st)	Michele Morrone	365 Days	Don Massimo Torricelli
2020 (41st)	Adam Sandler	Hubie Halloween	Hubie Dubois
2020 (41st)	David Spade	The Wrong Missy	Tim Morris
2021 (42nd)
2021 (42nd)	LeBron James	Space Jam: A New Legacy	Himself
2021 (42nd)	Scott Eastwood	Dangerous	Dylan "D" Forrester
2021 (42nd)	Roe Hartrampf	Diana the Musical	Charles, Prince of Wales
2021 (42nd)	Ben Platt	Dear Evan Hansen	Evan Hansen
2021 (42nd)	Mark Wahlberg	Infinite	Evan McCauley & Heinrich Treadway (2020)
2022 (43rd)
2022 (43rd)	Jared Leto	Morbius	Dr. Michael Morbius / Morbius, the Living Vampire
2022 (43rd)	Pete Davidson	Marmaduke	Marmaduke (voice only)
2022 (43rd)	Tom Hanks	Disney's Pinocchio	Geppetto
2022 (43rd)	Machine Gun Kelly	Good Mourning	London Clash
2022 (43rd)	Sylvester Stallone	Samaritan	Joe Smith / Samaritan / Nemesis
2023 (44th)
2023 (44th)	Jon Voight	Mercy	Patrick Quinn
2023 (44th)	Russell Crowe	The Pope's Exorcist	Gabriele Amorth
2023 (44th)	Vin Diesel	Fast X	Dominic Toretto
2023 (44th)	Chris Evans	Ghosted	Cole Turner
2023 (44th)	Jason Statham	Meg 2: The Trench	Jonas Taylor
2024 (45th)
2024 (45th)	Jerry Seinfeld	Unfrosted	Bob Cabana
2024 (45th)	Jack Black	Dear Santa	Satan / "Santa Claus"
2024 (45th)	Zachary Levi	Harold and the Purple Crayon	Harold
2024 (45th)	Joaquin Phoenix	Joker: Folie à Deux	Arthur Fleck / Joker
2024 (45th)	Dennis Quaid	Reagan	Ronald Reagan
2025 (46th)
2025 (46th)	Ice Cube	War of the Worlds	Will Radford
2025 (46th)	Dave Bautista	In the Lost Lands	Boyce
2025 (46th)	Scott Eastwood	Alarum	Agent Joe Travers
2025 (46th)	Jared Leto	Tron: Ares	Ares
2025 (46th)	The Weeknd	Hurry Up Tomorrow	Abel Tesfaye

== Multiple wins ==
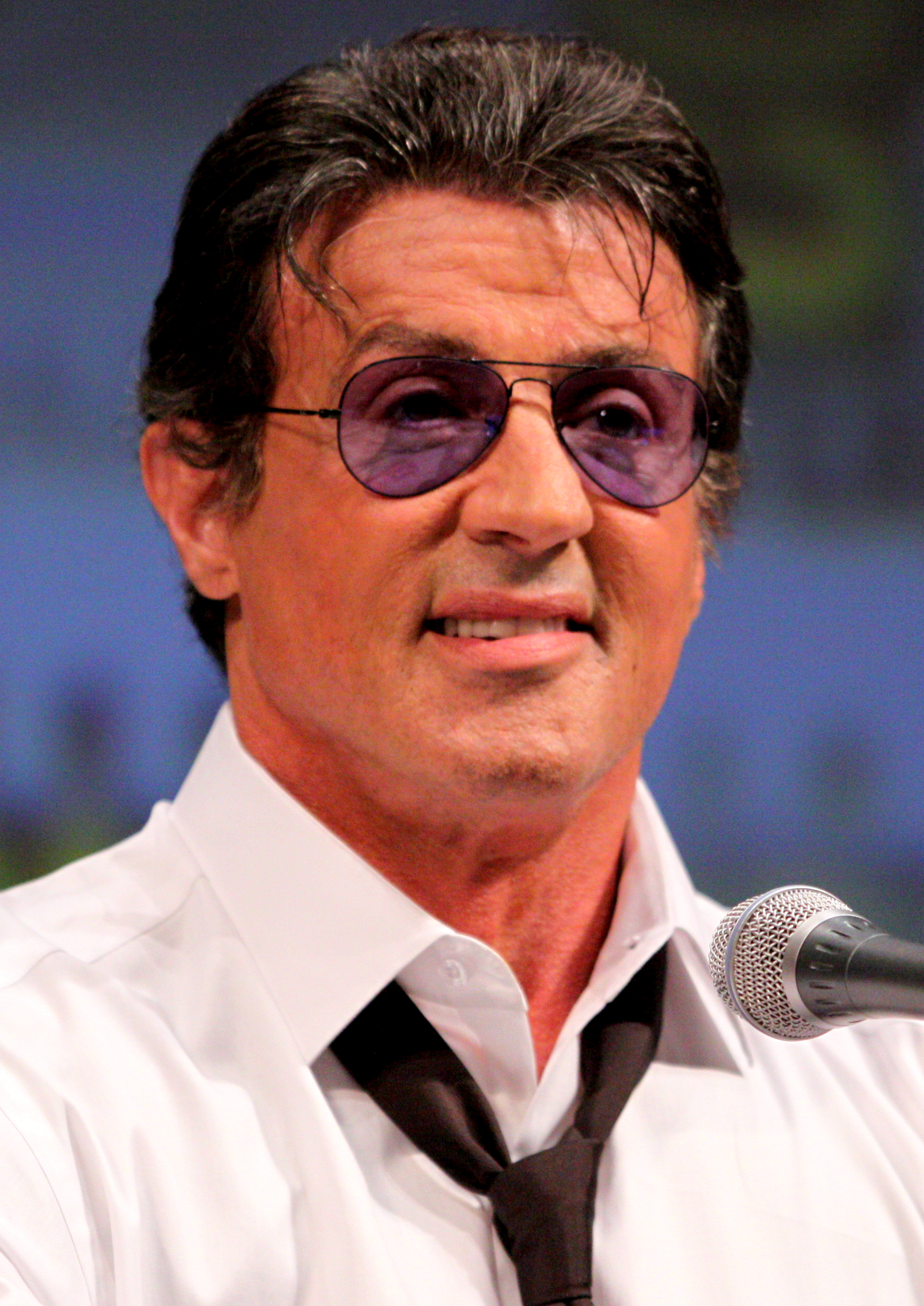
Sylvester Stallone holds the records for most total nominations (16), consecutive nominations (9, 1984–92), and wins (4).

4 wins

- Sylvester Stallone (2 consecutive)

3 wins

- Kevin Costner
- Adam Sandler (2 consecutive)

2 wins

- Pauly Shore (consecutive)
- John Travolta

== Multiple nominations ==
George W. Bush (2001–09) holds the distinction of being the first President of the United States to win a competitive Razzie during his administration.

Donald Trump (2017–21) is the most recent president to be nominated for the award for Worst Actor. He is also the first person to become president after having already won a Razzie Award.

16 nominations
- Sylvester Stallone

12 nominations

- Adam Sandler

7 nominations

- Kevin Costner
- John Travolta

5 nominations

- Nicolas Cage
- Eddie Murphy

4 nominations

- Ben Affleck
- Johnny Depp
- Arnold Schwarzenegger
- Bruce Willis

3 nominations

- Tom Cruise
- Will Ferrell
- Ashton Kutcher
- Keanu Reeves
- Burt Reynolds
- Steven Seagal
- Mark Wahlberg

2 nominations

- Christopher Atkins
- Jack Black
- Gerard Butler
- Andrew Dice Clay
- Vin Diesel
- Jamie Dornan
- Scott Eastwood
- Cuba Gooding Jr.
- Larry the Cable Guy
- Taylor Lautner
- Jared Leto
- Mike Myers
- Judd Nelson
- Ryan O'Neal
- Al Pacino
- Robert Pattinson
- Prince
- Rob Schneider
- Pauly Shore
- Ben Stiller
- Jon Voight
