= 1996 Stinkers Bad Movie Awards =

Award ceremony presented by the Stinkers Bad Movie Awards in 1996

19th Stinkers Bad Movie Awards
- Date: 1997

Highlights
- Worst Film: Striptease
- Most awards: Bio-Dome, The Stupids, and Twister (2)
- Most nominations: The Stupids (4)

The 19th Stinkers Bad Movie Awards were released by the Hastings Bad Cinema Society in 1997 to honour the worst films the film industry had to offer in 1996. Listed as follows are the different categories with their respective winners and nominees, including Worst Picture and its dishonourable mentions, which are films that were considered for Worst Picture but ultimately failed to make the final ballot (35 total). All winners are highlighted.

== Winners and Nominees ==
=== Worst Picture ===
Film	Production company(s)
Striptease	Columbia
Independence Day	20th Century Fox
Jack	Hollywood Pictures
The Stupids	New Line Cinema
Twister	Warner Bros.

==== Dishonourable Mentions ====
- Barb Wire (Gramercy)
- Big Bully (Warner Bros.)
- Bio-Dome (MGM)
- Black Sheep (Paramount)
- Bogus (Warner Bros.)
- Bulletproof (Universal)
- The Cable Guy (Columbia)
- Carpool (Warner Bros.)
- Chain Reaction (20th Century Fox)
- The Crow: City of Angels (Miramax)
- Daylight (Universal)
- Diabolique (Warner Bros.)
- Ed (Universal)
- Eddie (Hollywood)
- The English Patient (Miramax)
- Evita (Hollywood)
- Executive Decision (Warner Bros.)
- Fargo (Gramercy)
- Flipper (Universal)
- From Dusk till Dawn (Miramax)
- Happy Gilmore (Universal)
- The Island of Dr. Moreau (New Line)
- Jingle All The Way (20th Century Fox)
- Joe's Apartment (Warner Bros.)
- The Juror (Columbia)
- Kazaam (Touchstone)
- Kids in the Hall: Brain Candy (Paramount)
- Kingpin (MGM)
- Little Indian, Big City (Buena Vista)
- Mars Attacks! (Warner Bros.)
- Mary Reilly (TriStar)
- Mission: Impossible (Paramount)
- Mr. Wrong (Touchstone)
- Theodore Rex (New Line)
- Two Much (Touchstone)

=== Other Categories ===
Worst Actor: Tom Arnold for Big Bully, Carpool and The Stupids; Adam Sandler for Happy Gilmore; Arnold Schwarzenegger for Jingle All The Way; Pauly Shore for Bio-Dome; Sylvester Stallone for Daylight	Worst Actress: Whoopi Goldberg for Bogus, Eddie and Theodore Rex; Ellen DeGeneres for Mr. Wrong; Pamela Anderson for Barb Wire; Demi Moore for The Juror and Striptease; Julia Roberts for Mary Reilly
Worst Supporting Actor: Marlon Brando for The Island of Dr. Moreau; James Caan for Bulletproof; Francis Capra for Kazaam; Burt Reynolds for Striptease; Quentin Tarantino for From Dusk till Dawn	Worst Supporting Actress: Jami Gertz for Twister; Faye Dunaway for The Chamber and Dunston Checks In; Brenda Fricker for A Time to Kill; Melanie Griffith for Mulholland Falls and Two Much; Rita Wilson for Jingle All The Way
Worst Screenplay for a Film Grossing Over $100M Using Hollywood Math: Twister (Warner Bros.), written by Michael Crichton and Anne-Marie Martin; Independence Day (20th Century Fox), written by Dean Devlin and Roland Emmerich; Mission: Impossible (Paramount), story by David Koepp and Steven Zaillian; screenplay by Koepp and Robert Towne; based on the TV series Mission: Impossible	Worst Resurrection of a TV Show: Sgt. Bilko (Universal); Flipper (Universal); Mission: Impossible (Paramount)
Biggest Acting Stretch: Ellen DeGeneres plays a heterosexual woman (Mr. Wrong)	Most Painfully Unfunny Comedy: Bio-Dome (MGM); The Cable Guy (Columbia); Jingle All the Way (20th Century Fox); The Kids in the Hall: Brain Candy (Paramount); The Stupids (New Line)
Worst On-Screen Hairstyle: Stephen Baldwin in Bio-Dome; Marlon Brando in The Island of Dr. Moreau; Francis Capra in Kazaam	Worst Sequel: The Evening Star (Paramount); All Dogs Go to Heaven 2 (MGM/UA); The Crow: City of Angels (Miramax); D3: The Mighty Ducks (Disney); Escape from L.A. (Paramount)
The Sequel Nobody Was Clamoring For: The Crow: City of Angels (Miramax); D3: The Mighty Ducks (Disney); Homeward Bound II (Disney); Muppet Treasure Island (Disney); A Very Brady Sequel (Paramount)	The Founders Award - What Were They Thinking and Why?: The Phantom (Paramount); The Stupids (New Line)
