= The Stupids (film) =

- Theatrical release poster
- Directed by: John Landis
- Written by: Brent Forrester
- Based on: The Stupids by: James Marshall; Harry Allard
- Produced by: Leslie Belzberg
- Starring: Tom Arnold; Jessica Lundy; Bug Hall; Alex McKenna; Mark Metcalf; Matt Keeslar; Christopher Lee
- Cinematography: Manfred Guthe
- Edited by: Dale Beldin
- Music by: Christopher Stone
- Production company: Savoy Pictures
- Distributed by: New Line Cinema (United States); Rank Film Distributors (United Kingdom)
- Release date: August 8, 1996
- Running time: 94 minutes
- Countries: Canada; United Kingdom; United States
- Language: English
- Budget: $25 million
- Box office: $3.4 million (US/UK)

The Stupids is a 1996 adventure comedy film starring Tom Arnold and directed by John Landis. It is based on The Stupids, characters from a series of books written by Harry Allard and illustrated by James Marshall. The film follows the fictional family, the Stupids, with a last name synonymous with their behavior. The story begins with patriarch Stanley Stupid believing "sender" from letters marked "return to sender" is a wicked man planning a conspiracy. Adding several misunderstandings, they unwittingly save the world from military chaos, while believing a fake story about a fictional man named Sender and his plot to confiscate everyone's mail and garbage.

The Stupids was theatrically released on August 8, 1996 in the United States by New Line Cinema. The film received largely negative reviews from critics and was a box-office failure, grossing $3.4 million worldwide on a $25 million budget.

== Plot ==
Stanley and Joan Stupid are convinced that they are the victims of a conspiracy that steals their garbage every week. In an attempt to uncover this, Stanley follows the garbage truck to the city dump, where he stumbles across Colonel Neidermeyer, who is selling contraband weaponry to a group of terrorists. He believes that Stanley is a secret agent who has uncovered their operation and orders him assassinated. After several attempts on his life, resulting in him unintentionally killing his would-be assassins, he narrowly escapes a car bomb and is presumed dead by Neidermeyer.

Stanley and Joan's children, Petunia and Buster believe that their parents have been kidnapped by a Chinese restaurant and go there in search of them. They reunite with Joan, who explains her theory that the police have turned against them and are responsible for Stanley's disappearance.

Once the Stupids are reunited at home, Joan tells Petunia and Buster about Stanley's last job for the postal service where he discovered all the letters being marked "return to sender", but was fired before he could find out who "Mr. Sender" was. He tells his family about the conspiracy theory he has invented a machine that combines all the ideas their overactive imaginations have created, including the "Evil Mr. Sender", who is plotting to steal all the mail and garbage from America and employing the police to kidnap anybody. The scheme is discovered. When they find local museum curator Charles Sender in the phone book they set off in pursuit of him, ultimately tracking him to a television studio where Stanley appears on a talk show and is spotted by Niedermeyer. Stanley is kidnapped and brought to the army base.

While being held hostage at the army base, Stanley overhears that the address of the warehouse is being used for illegal arms deals. Following an escape, the Stupids go there where they expect to find Sender and the stolen mail. They confront Neidermeyer and his terrorist associates in a battle, resulting in some explosions that cause the police to investigate the warehouse. The associates are arrested, but Neidermeyer escapes. Stanley offers what he perceives to be heroic advice about how Sender can repent his evil ways, but he takes them as road directions. The Stupids return home, only to find a vengeful Neidermeyer waiting for them, armed, with a handgun. Luckily, just as he is about to kill them, he is knocked out from behind the front door by a deliveryman whom Joan had called round earlier. In the end, the Stupids celebrate their success with an outdoor barbecue.

== Cast ==
- Tom Arnold as Stanley Stupid
- Jessica Lundy as Joan Stupid
- Bug Hall as Buster Stupid
- Alex McKenna as Petunia Stupid
- Mark Metcalf as Colonel Neidermeyer
- Matt Keeslar as Lieutenant Neal
- Frankie Faison as Lloyd
- Christopher Lee as Evil Mr. Sender
- Bob Keeshan as Charles Sender
- Rolonda Watts as Talk Show Hostess
- Harvey Atkin as Deli Guy
- Jenny McCarthy as Glamorous Actress
- David Ferry as Late Night Show Host
- Max Landis as Graffiti Artist
- George Chiang as Chinese Waiter

=== Celebrity cameos ===
- Atom Egoyan as TV Studio Guard
- Norman Jewison as TV Director
- Robert Wise as Stanley's Neighbor
- David Cronenberg as Postal Supervisor
- Gillo Pontecorvo as Talk Show Guest
- Costa-Gavras as Gas Station Attendant
- Anthony J. Mifsud as Explosive Guy
- Gurinder Chadha as Reporter #1
- Mick Garris as Reporter #2

== Production ==
The film was shot in Toronto, Ontario (downtown shots) and Uxbridge, Ontario (Home located at 55 Quaker Village Drive, Uxbridge, Ontario).

== Reception ==
The film grossed $2,491,989 in the United States and Canada and a mere £900,000 in the United Kingdom from an estimated $25 million budget, and became John Landis' weakest performing film. The film opened to negative reviews. Review aggregation website Rotten Tomatoes gave it a score of 19% based on 16 reviews, as of September 2026. Audiences surveyed by CinemaScore gave it a grade of "C+" on a scale of A+ to F.

Bruce Fretts of Entertainment Weekly gave it a grade F, calling it "Guaranteed 100 percent laugh-free." Derek Elley of Variety wrote: "The problem with The Stupids is that it isn't stupid enough by half. Lacking both the sheer gross-out humor of Dumb and Dumber and the carefully thought-through tone of the Brady pics".

John Landis said that he was proud of the film: "I'm happy to say it's very successful on television, and extremely successful on video because people buy it for their kids. It's meant for ten-year-olds. That really went under the radar. But I really like that picture. And that one had a great score by Christopher Stone."

== Accolades ==
At the 17th Golden Raspberry Awards and 1996 Stinkers Bad Movie Awards, Tom Arnold won Worst Actor for his performances in Big Bully, Carpool and this film. At the Golden Raspberry Awards, it was also nominated for the awards for Worst Picture, Worst Director (John Landis) and Worst Screenplay (Brent Forrester). At the Stinkers Bad Movie Awards, it was also nominated for Worst Picture and Most Painfully Unfunny Comedy; it was also handpicked for the Founders Award - What Were They Thinking and Why? alongside The Phantom.
