= Big Bully =

Big Bully may refer to:

- Jimmy Jacobs (born 1984), wrestler
- Big Bully (film), a 1996 American dark comedy film
- A boss in Super Mario 64, a 1996 platform video game
