= Miss Nelson is Missing =

1977 American picture book by Harry Allard and James Marshall

Miss Nelson is Missing is a 1977 children's book by Harry Allard, illustrated by James Marshall (1942–1992). Children in a classroom learn to deal with the mysterious disappearance of their teacher Miss Nelson and her replacement by an awful substitute teacher, Viola Swamp.

The book reveals that Swamp is actually a disguise used by Miss Nelson. Miss Nelson and Swamp are never in the same scene, a clue of the reality of Swamp.

Carole Egger of the Houston Post wrote that the book shows why it is bad to not show appreciation, and that it highlights "nuances of relationships".

== Reception ==
It received favorable reviews. A mother wrote about how her daughter responded to the story.

Egger wrote that the book is "pleasant".

Judith Viorst of The New York Times wrote that the book had a "pleasantly modest and gentle" and "unpretentiously low‐key" plot and lesson, and that the book should have been smaller with a lower price. Christopher Lehmann-Haupt, of the same publication, wrote that the characters had a "goofy" appearance and that that would appeal to children.

== Adaptations ==
There have been several adaptations of the book Miss Nelson is Missing.

- Miss Nelson is Missing (1979, 14 minutes, animated)
- Miss Nelson is Missing (1990, 9 minutes, video)
- Sleepyhead Stories Episode: "Miss Nelson Is Missing" (2019, 13 minutes, podcast episode)
- The Ace Literacy Project Episode: "Miss Nelson Is Missing" - season 3, episode 41 (2023, 17 minutes, podcast episode)
- Untitled Adaptation of: Miss Nelson is Missing book (Netflix film, in development)
- Live theatre production
