= Striptease (film) =

1996 film by Andrew Bergman

- Theatrical release poster
- Directed by: Andrew Bergman
- Screenplay by: Andrew Bergman
- Based on: Strip Tease by Carl Hiaasen
- Produced by: Andrew Bergman; Mike Lobell
- Starring: Demi Moore; Armand Assante; Ving Rhames; Robert Patrick; Burt Reynolds
- Cinematography: Stephen Goldblatt
- Edited by: Anne V. Coates
- Music by: Howard Shore
- Production companies: Castle Rock Entertainment; Lobell/Bergman Productions
- Distributed by: Columbia Pictures
- Release dates: June 23, 1996 (premiere); June 28, 1996 (United States)
- Running time: 117 minutes
- Country: United States
- Language: English
- Budget: $50 million
- Box office: $113.3 million

Striptease is a 1996 American black comedy film written, co-produced and directed by Andrew Bergman, and starring Demi Moore, Armand Assante, Ving Rhames, Robert Patrick and Burt Reynolds. Based on Carl Hiaasen's 1993 best-selling novel of the same name, the film centers on an FBI secretary-turned-stripper who becomes involved in both a child-custody dispute and corrupt politics.

Moore was paid a then-unprecedented $12.5 million to star in Striptease, making her the highest-paid film actress up to that time. Released theatrically on June 28, 1996, by Columbia Pictures and produced by Castle Rock Entertainment with a $50 million budget, the film grossed $33 million domestically (47th place) and $113 million worldwide. It was somewhat more successful in the subsequent video rental market. However, it was panned by critics and won six Golden Raspberry Awards including Worst Picture.

== Plot ==
Former FBI secretary Erin Grant loses custody of her seven-year-old daughter Angela to her ex-husband Darrell. She had lost her job due to his arrest record as a drug addict and dealer. To obtain the $15,000 needed to afford an appeal to recover her, Erin becomes a stripper at the Eager Beaver strip club in Miami. She attempts to find out where Darrell is from his older sister Rita, as he has again relocated without informing Erin. He uses Angela to steal wheelchairs from hospitals to sell them on the black market.

Congressman David Lane Dilbeck, representing Florida's 5th congressional district, visits the club and becomes infatuated with Erin. Aware of his embarrassing indulgences, patron Jerry Killian approaches her with a plan to manipulate Dilbeck to settle the custody dispute in her favor.

However, as Dilbeck is the chairman of the subcommittee on sugar, he has powerful business connections. These include lobbyist Malcolm J. Moldowsky, his righthand man, and father-and-son sugar barons Willie and Chris Rojo, whose price supports are worth hundreds of millions of dollars. Consequently, those who could potentially humiliate him in an election are murdered.

Attorney Alan Mordecai has photos of a drunk Dilbeck assaulting fellow patron Paul Guber, his client, so he invites the club’s bouncer and head of security Shad to help him blackmail Dilbeck. Meanwhile, Jerry is found dead in Lake Okeechobee while Miami Police Department Lieutenant Al Garcia is on vacation there with his wife Donna and son Andy. An autopsy reveals that he was drowned in tap water before being discarded in the lake.

Finding photos of Erin all over Jerry's apartment, Garcia ventures to the Eager Beaver. There, she explains her current dilemma and asks him to ensure that the Dade County police department drops Darrell as an informant for the vice squad. This way, during her appeal, he can be exposed as a criminal. Fully sympathetic to her plight, he complies.

However, the judge overseeing Erin's civil court case, L.W. Fingerhut, suffers a fatal heart attack, which delays her appeal by six months. To protect Angela, Erin retrieves her from Rita's care, Darrell having previously let slip that Rita looks after Angela on Fridays.

Mordecai approaches Dilbeck with the Eager Beaver blackmail photo, agitating Malcolm further. After Erin takes Angela with her to work, Darrell ambushes her at knifepoint in her car outside the club, but Shad breaks his arm once he appears to rescue her. After Erin finishes her shift, Garcia arrives, shows her the blackmail photo and tells her to contact him if she is threatened, now fully aware why Jerry was murdered.

Dilbeck's personal interest in Erin persists, so she is invited to perform privately for him. He asks her to become his lover and later his wife, despite his staff becoming increasingly concerned. Malcolm threatens Erin with putting Angela in state care if she talks about Dilbeck to anyone.

Eventually, Mordecai turns up dead, increasing Garcia's concern for her. Dilbeck and Malcolm debate whether to kill Erin or simply silence her by threatening to take away her daughter. However, Erin, suspecting Dilbeck's complicity in the murders, concocts a plan to trap him.

Malcolm, aware of Erin's contact with Garcia and her FBI background, suggests Dilbeck invite Erin for another private show, planning to kill her afterwards. She goes alone, but an intoxicated Darrell arrives and assaults Malcolm. Darrell then interrupts the dance, allowing Erin to retrieve a gun and force him and Dilbeck to go to the nearby Belle Glade sugar refinery. There she has invited TV crews for a news conference.

En route, Erin forces Darrell to write a note releasing custody of Angela to her and, once there, tricks Dilbeck into confessing to the murders on tape. As Malcolm arrives, Garcia serendipitously appears along with the news crew and Dilbeck is soon after arrested. Erin, having regained full guardianship of Angela, thanks Garcia and Shad for assisting her and jokingly expresses interest in Garcia running for Congress as Dilbeck's replacement.

== Cast ==
- Demi Moore as Erin Grant, a former FBI secretary who is the most popular stripper of the Eager Beaver, a well-attended strip club in Miami, Florida
- Armand Assante as Lieutenant Al Garcia
- Ving Rhames as Gerard L. "Shad" Shaddick, a bouncer and the Eager Beaver's head of security
- Robert Patrick as Darrell Grant, Erin's ex-husband
- Burt Reynolds as Congressman David Lane Dilbeck, a powerful and corrupt congressman obsessed with Erin
- Paul Guilfoyle as Malcolm J. Moldowsky, a lobbyist and Dilbeck's right-hand man
- Jerry Grayson as Orly, the manager of the Eager Beaver
- Rumer Willis as Angela Grant, Erin's daughter
- Robert Stanton as Erb Crandall, Dilbeck's executive assistant
- William Hill as Jerry Killian, an Eager Beaver patron who offers to help Erin retrieve Angela
- Stuart Pankin as Alan Mordecai, an attorney whose office is located above the Porpoise Video store
- Dina Spybey as Monique Jr., a sexy and popular foreign stripper hailing from Paris, France
- PaSean Wilson as Sabrina Hepburn
- Pandora Peaks as Urbana Sprawl, a popular stripper from Fort Lauderdale, Florida
- Barbara Alyn Woods as Lorelei, a stripper and recent transfer to the Eager Beaver from the Flesh Farm, a rival strip club
- Kimberly Flynn as Ariel Sharon ("Miss Gaza Strip"), formerly a decorated nurse in the Israeli army
- Rena Riffel as Tiffany Glass
- Siobhan Fallon as Rita Grant, Erin's ex-sister-in-law
- Gary Basaraba as Alberto, Rita's partner and a security guard at the Turkey Point nuclear power plant

Gianni Russo and José Zúñiga play father-and-son sugar barons Willie & Chris Rojo, while Eduardo Yáñez and Antoni Corone appear as the Rojos' bodyguards Chico & Nico. Frances Fisher also makes a small appearance as Lieutenant Garcia's wife, Donna, while writer/director and co-producer Andrew Bergman's son Teddy appears as the couple's son Andy and co-producer Mike Lobell's daughter Anna appears as a clerk at Porpoise Video. Assante's cousin Marco, in addition to serving as his personal assistant on the film, appears as a patron at the Eager Beaver and Keone Young appears as Ling, owner and manager of the Flesh Farm.

== Production ==
The screenplay itself was written by Andrew Bergman, who also directed. According to one critic, the novel's plot is "quite faithfully followed" by the screenplay, but in bringing the complicated story to the screen, "Bergman forgets to explain persuasively what a nice girl like Erin – smart, spunky and a former FBI employee – is doing in a dump called the Eager Beaver."

"Striptease was hard because the tone was so crazy," explained Bergman. "How do you stay true to the tone? You have to be true to those strip clubs. There's always some woman with like 50 triple-Ds, they always advertise and you have to have someone like that. To actually see it, you’re walking this fine line. I didn't want to sanitize it and I didn't and I got my ass kicked for it." He also admitted, "I loved the book and the funny thing was, [author Carl] Hiaasen loved the movie. He thought it was really, really true to the book, which I wanted to do! I don't regret it. I was treated like a freakin’ child molester for making that movie, but so be it."

=== Casting ===
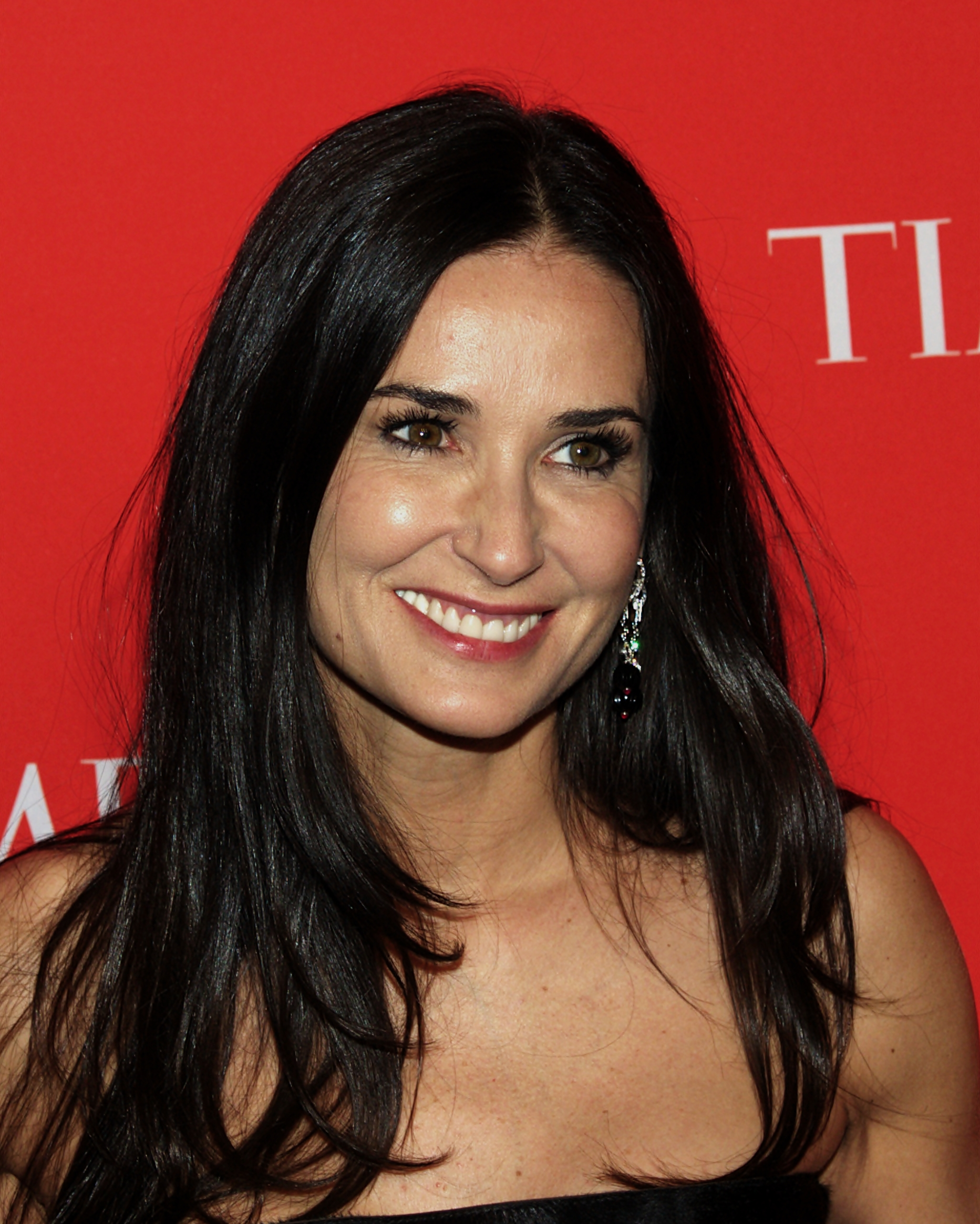
Demi Moore played Erin Grant in the film.

When asked about casting Demi Moore in the film, Bergman described, "Is Demi the funniest person in the world? No. Would the movie have been made without her? Probably not. No other major star was willing to take her clothes off and I was not going to do a TNT version of Striptease with people running around in swimsuits."

To prepare for her role as Erin Grant, Moore visited strip clubs in New York City, California and Florida and she met and observed strippers at work. She also read the novel and practiced yoga for flexibility. Moore was cast before other important parts were cast, creating some interest in the project. In the first attempt at filming Moore stripping, two hundred extras were used to portray the audience. Although their salaries were small, many accepted the role to see Moore nude. After waiting for a while, when Moore finally appeared and started dancing the crowd turned so loud and wild that the shooting had to temporarily cease. As Moore said, "After my experience, I felt very confident."

The filmmakers, in trying actors out for the part of Shad, sought someone "at least 6'2" and physically massive...any ethnicity", eventually casting Ving Rhames. Burt Reynolds based his performance as Congressman Dilbeck on politicians he knew from his youth, as his father was a police chief and prominent local Republican. When the filmmakers' first choice, Gene Hackman, turned the role down, Reynolds contacted Castle Rock head Rob Reiner and traveled to Miami to audition, despite not being whom they originally envisioned for the part. "To be honest," said producer Lobell, "we were not enthusiastic at first. There was the hair and his reputation, but we were curious... At the first audition, on the first day, Burt had to take off his toupee in front of six or seven people. It was tough for him, but he did it. It was a very, very humbling thing to do. But by the end of the audition, it was really clear that Burt was the guy." "I knew I could play him," said Reynolds. "I could make him likable and dangerous. There are very few people who can do that. I always played likable and dangerous. I had a persona. Unfortunately, my persona became bigger than my acting." Reynolds accepted a salary of $350,000; lower than what he had been paid earlier in his career.

Moore's own daughter Rumer Willis, who was 7 years old when the film was released, played Erin's daughter Angela. As Moore explained, "she [Willis] wanted it so badly" that Moore specifically asked for her to be cast in the role. In reality, this required Willis to see her mother dancing topless, for a scene in which Angela sees Erin performing. However, Moore said that this was acceptable, as "[W]e don't shame the body, we encourage the body as something beautiful and natural and my children bathe with me and I walk around naked."

The cast included some notable real-world strippers such as Pandora Peaks. "Talk about a happy set", said Bergman. "We were shooting in Miami for six months. It was a gas".

=== Reshot ending ===
During test screenings, audiences objected to a scene at the end where Dilbeck becomes violent and attempts to rape Grant, holding a knife to her throat. The scene was reshot five months later to make it funnier, causing a one-month delay in the release, but test screenings also turned up less than favorable reactions.

== Soundtrack ==
Striptease: Music from the Motion Picture Soundtrack

Film score by Various Artists
- Released: June 25, 1996
- Label: Capitol Records

Striptease: Music from the Motion Picture Soundtrack was released on June 25, 1996. While the soundtrack did not include every song heard in the film, a notable exclusion were most tracks Erin (Demi Moore's character) danced to in the film, which, aside from "If I Was Your Girlfriend" by Prince, were all sung by Annie Lennox (whether as part of the Eurythmics or solo). While "Sweet Dreams (Are Made of This)" was featured on the disc, "Money Can't Buy It", "Cold" and "Little Bird" were left off, as was "Missionary Man", which was played during the end credits. Furthermore, it excluded the song "(Pussy, Pussy, Pussy) Whose Kitty Cat Are You?" by the Light Crust Doughboys which won the Golden Raspberry Award for Worst Original Song.

Striptease: Music from the Motion Picture Soundtrack
No.	Title	Artist(s)	Length
1.	"Gimme Some Lovin'"	The Spencer Davis Group	2:58
2.	"Get Outta My Dreams, Get into My Car"	Billy Ocean	5:33
3.	"The Tide Is High"	Blondie	4:42
4.	"Expressway to Your Heart"	The Soul Survivors	2:16
5.	"Green Onions"	Booker T. & the M.G.'s	2:51
6.	"Love Child (Halaila)"	Laladin	3:18
7.	"I Live for You"	Chynna Phillips	3:45
8.	"You've Really Got a Hold on Me"	The Miracles	2:59
9.	"Mony Mony"	Billy Idol	5:03
10.	"If I Was Your Girlfriend"	Prince	3:46
11.	"I Hate Myself for Loving You"	Joan Jett and the Blackhearts	4:12
12.	"Sweet Dreams (Are Made of This)"	Eurythmics	3:36
13.	"Return to Me"	Dean Martin	2:24

== Release ==
Striptease premiered on June 23, 1996, in New York City and was released in the United States five days later. It opened in Australia, France and Germany in August and Argentina, Italy, Bolivia, South Africa, the United Kingdom, Brazil and Japan in September.

Nudity was heavily emphasized in advertisements. The Motion Picture Association of America raised concerns regarding a poster that it felt revealed too much of Moore's naked body. A Castle Rock employee disagreed, saying "there are racier perfume ads."

The previous year's film about nude dancers, Showgirls, was generally disliked, so filmmakers feared audiences would pre-judge Striptease on this basis. To avoid any association, advertisements were designed to make Striptease look more comedic than Showgirls, which was a drama. Besides the subject matter, Striptease and Showgirls did have two notable connections. The choreography in these films was by the same person, Marguerite Derricks. Both also featured performances by Rena Riffel, who plays a dancer in each. To promote the film, Moore appeared on the Late Show with David Letterman and a Barbara Walters special. In both cases, she danced or otherwise exhibited her body.

== Reception ==
=== Critical response ===
Striptease holds an 11% rating on Rotten Tomatoes based on 72 reviews, with an average score of 3.9/10. The critical consensus reads, "Striptease can't decide whether it is a lurid thriller or a sexy satire - which becomes a moot point as it proves disastrously incapable of pulling either off." On Metacritic, the film has a score of 37 out of 100 based on 27 critics, indicating "generally unfavorable reviews". In the Carl Hiaasen book of the same name, upon which the movie was based, every character was premised upon being a source of amusement. In the movie, however, there was a major departure, as the main character, played by Moore, was meant to be portrayed differently. Roger Ebert of the Chicago Sun-Times complimented some of the characters, but ultimately concluded the film failed because "all of the characters are hilarious except for Demi Moore's." He felt the drama surrounding the main character "throws a wet blanket over the rest of the party." Ebert also found the nudity not too sexy. Gene Siskel heavily panned the film on Siskel and Ebert criticizing Bergman's screenplay as well as Moore's character and performance finding her "deadly boring". Leonard Maltin was harsher, writing in his book that the film was too depressing and "Not funny enough, or dramatic enough, or sexy enough, or bad enough, to qualify as entertainment in any category." Barbara Cramer concurred with Ebert that Moore's character was written too dramatically, compared to other characters. She said the film was predictable and would appeal mostly to "post-pubescent schoolboys or closet voyeurs." However, Cramer also cited Reynolds' "best role in years," and said Rhames was "worth the price of admission."

Brian D. Johnson of Maclean's, who thought Moore's acting was terrible, predicted that despite Moore's financial success, her career depended on the success of this film and the film was "tacky, pretentious-and boring." This critic described Striptease as displaying Moore's vanity. David Ansen of Newsweek, sharing Ebert's view on Moore's character, also claimed Striptease failed as a drama because it had no mystery, revealing the identity of its villains early. Moreover, the "damsel-in-distress angle generates zero tension." Daniel P. Franklin, in his book Politics and Film: The Political Culture of Film in the United States went so far as to call Striptease "the worst film ever made" and stated "The film pays homage to Moore's surgical breast enhancement". Nathan Rabin, reviewing the film for his series "My Year of Flops", described the film thus: "Moore's dour lead performance sabotages the film from the get-go. It's as if director Andrew Bergman told Moore she was acting in a serious drama about a struggling single mother...and then told everyone else in the cast that they were making a zany crime comedy filled with kooky characters, sleazy hustlers, dumbass opportunists and outsized caricatures."

Audiences surveyed by CinemaScore gave the film a grade of "B−" on scale of A+ to F.

=== Box office ===
Striptease made $12,322,069 in its first weekend, ranking fourth behind The Nutty Professor with Eddie Murphy, Eraser starring Arnold Schwarzenegger and Disney's The Hunchback of Notre Dame, in which Moore voiced the main character Esmeralda. Ultimately, Striptease made $33,109,743 in the United States and domestically it was the 47th highest-grossing film of 1996. It made $113,309,743 internationally, having grossed £2,294,568 in the UK.

=== Home media ===
Striptease was released on VHS on November 19, 1996, and on DVD on July 27, 1999. It found success in the video rental market, ranking 24th in the video rentals of 1997 in the United States.

Bergman later described the film as one of his most successful projects, especially referring to the video rental market.

== Accolades ==
Award	Category	Recipient(s)	Result	Ref(s)
Dallas–Fort Worth Film Critics Association Awards	Worst Film		Won	
Golden Raspberry Awards (1996)	Worst Picture	Mike Lobell, Andrew Bergman	Won	
Golden Raspberry Awards (1996)	Worst Director	Andrew Bergman	Won	
Golden Raspberry Awards (1996)	Worst Actress	Demi Moore (also for The Juror)	Won	
Golden Raspberry Awards (1996)	Worst Supporting Actor	Burt Reynolds	Nominated	
Golden Raspberry Awards (1996)	Worst Screenplay	Screenplay by Andrew Bergman; Based on the book by Carl Hiaasen	Won	
Golden Raspberry Awards (1996)	Worst Screen Couple	Demi Moore and Burt Reynolds	Won	
Golden Raspberry Awards (1996)	Worst Original Song	"Pussy, Pussy, Pussy (Whose Kitty Cat Are You?)"; Music and Lyrics by Marvin "Smokey" Montgomery	Won	
Golden Raspberry Awards (1999)	Worst Picture of the Decade		Nominated	
Stinkers Bad Movie Awards	Worst Picture	Mike Lobell	Won	
Stinkers Bad Movie Awards	Worst Actress	Demi Moore (also for The Juror)	Nominated	
Stinkers Bad Movie Awards	Worst Supporting Actor	Burt Reynolds	Nominated	
Yoga Awards	Worst Foreign Actress	Demi Moore	Won	

== Controversies ==
In 1997, Striptease made news again when it was shown in a fourth-grade class in Chicago, Illinois. The teacher claimed the students chose the film but drew criticism since the film was risqué. The violent 1996 film Scream was shown in the same school on the same day, causing further controversy. In 2000 in Ireland, some viewers criticized the Raidió Teilifís Éireann for running Striptease. These viewers questioned the film's appropriateness and some considered it demeaning to women. The station felt it was not pornography and it was aired at night.

In 2003, Radioactive Films used a scene from Striptease featuring Moore nude in a video called Hollywood's Hottest. This raised a dispute as to whether the use of the scene qualified as fair use. A lawsuit was launched as a consequence.

When Bob Dole, who was the Republican presidential candidate for the 1996 United States presidential election, criticized Demi Moore for her role in the film Striptease, her then husband Bruce Willis, who often endorsed Republican presidential candidates, declined to endorse him.

Awards
Preceded by Showgirls	Golden Raspberry Award for Worst Picture; 17th Golden Raspberry Awards	Succeeded by The Postman
Preceded by Showgirls	Stinker Award for Worst Picture; 1996 Stinkers Bad Movie Awards	Succeeded by Batman & Robin
