= The Stupids =

Book series by James Marshall

The Stupids Step Out
- Author: Harry Allard
- Illustrator: James Marshall
- Language: English
- Genre: Children's picture book
- Publisher: Houghton Mifflin
- Publication date: April 17, 1974
- Publication place: United States
- Media type: Print (Hardcover)
- Pages: 32 pp
- ISBN: 0-395-18513-0
- OCLC: 000763716
- Followed by: The Stupids Have a Ball

The Stupids are a fictional family that appear in a series of children's books written by Harry Allard and James Marshall. The Stupids draw their humor from the fact that they are incompetent to the point of confusing the most simple concepts and tasks.

== Controversy ==
The Stupids series of books rank number 62 on the American Library Association's list of 100 Most Frequently Challenged Books of the entire 2000's decade.

== Books in the series ==
- The Stupids Step Out (1974)
- The Stupids Have a Ball (1978)
- The Stupids Die (1981)
- The Stupids Take Off (1989)

== Film version ==
In 1996, a film version was released starring Tom Arnold, directed by John Landis. The film details the family's pursuit of their trash, which they believe to be stolen, and the "conspiracy" they uncover in the process. The film was a box office failure; it was also widely panned by film critics and audiences alike.
