= James Marshall (author) =

American children's books author and illustrator (1942–1992)

- Born: October 10, 1942; San Antonio, Texas
- Died: October 13, 1992 (age 50)
- Occupations: Writer and illustrator

James Edward Marshall (October 10, 1942 – October 13, 1992), who sometimes published under the name Edward Marshall, was an American author-illustrator of children's literature, including the George and Martha series of picture books (1972–1988), and an illustrator of additional books including Miss Nelson is Missing (1977) by Harry Allard. In 2007, he was posthumously awarded the Children's Literature Legacy Award for "substantial and lasting contribution" to American children's literature.

== Early life and education ==
James Marshall was born on October 10, 1942, in San Antonio, Texas, where he grew up on his family's 85-acre farm. Marshall's father worked on the railroad and had a band, and his mother sang in the local church choir. The family later moved to Beaumont, Texas. Marshall said: "Beaumont is deep south and swampy and I hated it. I knew I would die if I stayed there so I diligently studied the viola, and eventually won a scholarship to the New England Conservatory in Boston."

He entered the New England Conservatory of Music but injured his hand in an airplane accident, causing his music career to end at age 19. Marshall returned to Texas, where he attended San Antonio College, and later transferred to Southern Connecticut State University, where he earned degrees in French and history.

== Career ==
From 1968 to 1970, Marshall taught French and Spanish classes at Cathedral High School in Boston, Massachusetts, despite not knowing Spanish. In 1970 he moved to New York City to work as an illustrator, and soon illustrated his first picture book, Plink, Plink, Plink by Byrd Baylor (1971). In 1972 he published George and Martha, his first book as an author-illustrator.

He illustrated several books by the writer Harry Allard including Miss Nelson Is Missing and The Stupids. Later in his career, Marshall illustrated picture book versions of classic fairy tales including Little Red Riding Hood, Mother Goose, Hansel and Gretel, and Goldilocks and the Three Bears.

As illustrator of Goldilocks and the Three Bears, Marshall was a runner-up for the Caldecott Medal in 1989 (the "Caldecott Honor Books" display silver rather than gold seals). He won a University of Mississippi Silver Medallion in 1992. Over his career, he was three times recognized by The New York Times Book Review as one of the best illustrated children's book of the year.

Marshall lived between an apartment in the Chelsea district of New York City and a home in Mansfield Hollow, Connecticut. He died on October 13, 1992, three days after his 50th birthday. Marshall's obituary states that he died of a brain tumor, but his sister has since clarified that he died of AIDS. Marshall was gay, and though he did not publicly come out during his lifetime, he was open with those he knew personally about his sexuality.

== Works ==
Title	Author	Illustrator	City	Publisher	Year
A Day With Whisker Wickles	Cynthia Jameson	James Marshall	New York	Coward McCann	1975
A Summer in the South	James Marshall	James Marshall	New York	Houghton Mifflin Harcourt	1977
A Frog and Her Dog	James Marshall	James Marshall	Boston	Houghton Mifflin	1977
All the Way Home	Lore Segal	James Marshall	New York	Farrar, Straus, Giroux	1973
Bonzini! The Tattooed Man	Jeffrey Allen	James Marshall	Boston	Little, Brown and Co	1976
Bumps in the Night	Harry Allard	James Marshall	New York	Bantam Doubleday Dell	1979
Carrot Nose	Jan Wahl	James Marshall		Farrar, Straus, and Giroux	1978
Choosing Books For Children: A Commonsense Guide	Betsy Hearne	James Marshall	New York	Delacorte	1990
Cinderella	Barbara Karlin	James Marshall	New York	Dial Books	1989
Dinner at Alberta's	Russell Hoban	James Marshall	New York	Thomas Y. Crowell	1975
Dinosaur's Housewarming Party	Norma Klein	James Marshall	New York	Crown Publishers	1974
Eugene	James Marshall	James Marshall			1975
Four Little Troubles	James Marshall	James Marshall	Boston	Houghton Mifflin	1975
Four on the Shore	Edward Marshall	James Marshall	New York	Dial	1985
Fox all Week	Edward Marshall	James Marshall	New York	Penguin	1984
Fox and His Friends	Edward Marshall	James Marshall	New York	Penguin	1982
Fox at School	Edward Marshall	James Marshall	New York	Dial	1983
Fox Be Nimble	James Marshall	James Marshall	New York	Dial	1990
Fox in Love	Edward Marshall	James Marshall	New York	Penguin	1982
Fox on Stage	James Marshall	James Marshall	New York	Penguin	1993
Fox on the Job	James Marshall	James Marshall	New York	Dial	1988
Fox on Wheels	Edward Marshall	James Marshall	New York	Dial	1983
Fox Outfoxed	James Marshall	James Marshall	New York	Penguin	1992
Fox Tales (Fox Outfoxed, Fox Be Nimble, Fox on Stage)	James Marshall	James Marshall	New York	Dial Books For Young Readers	1990
George and Martha	James Marshall	James Marshall	Boston	Houghton Mifflin	1972
George and Martha Encore	James Marshall	James Marshall	Boston	Houghton Mifflin	1973
George and Martha Back in Town	James Marshall	James Marshall	Boston	Houghton Mifflin	1984
George and Martha One Fine Day	James Marshall	James Marshall	Boston	Houghton Mifflin	1978
George and Martha Rise and Shine	James Marshall	James Marshall	Boston	Houghton Mifflin	1976
George and Martha Round and Round	James Marshall	James Marshall	Boston	Houghton Mifflin	1988
George and Martha Tons of Fun	James Marshall	James Marshall	Boston	Houghton Mifflin	1980
Go, Go, Go	James Marshall	James Marshall	Boston	Houghton Mifflin	1981
Goldilocks and the Three Bears	James Marshall	James Marshall	New York	Dial Books	1988
Hansel and Gretel	James Marshall	James Marshall	New York	Dial Books	1990
Haunted House Jokes	Louis Phillips	James Marshall	USA	Puffin	1988
Hey Diddle Diddle	James Marshall	James Marshall	New York	Farrar, Straus & Giroux	1979
How Beastly! A Menagerie of Nonsense Poems	Jane Yolen	James Marshall	New York	Collins	1980
I Will Not Go to Market Today	Harry Allard	James Marshall	New York	Dial	1979
It's So Nice to Have a Wolf Around the House	Harry Allard	James Marshall	Garden City	Doubleday	1977
James Marshall's Mother Goose	James Marshall	James Marshall	New York	Farrar, Straus & Giroux	1979
Lazy Stories	Diane Wolkstein	James Marshall	New York	Seabury Press	1976
MacGoose's Grocery	Frank Asch	James Marshall	New York	Dial	1978
Mary Alice Operator Number 9	Jeffrey Allen	James Marshall	Boston	Little Brown & Co.	1975
Miss. Dog's Christmas Treat	James Marshall	James Marshall	Boston	Houghton Mifflin	1973
Merry Christmas, Space Case	James Marshall	James Marshall	New York	Dial	1986
Miss Nelson Has a Field Day	Harry Allard	James Marshall	Boston	Houghton Mifflin	1985
Miss Nelson is Back	Harry Allard	James Marshall	Boston	Houghton Mifflin Co.	1982
Miss Nelson is Missing	Harry Allard	James Marshall	Boston	Houghton Mifflin	1977
My Friends the Frogs	James Marshall	James Marshall	Lexington, Mass.	D.C. Heath	1989
Nosey Mrs. Rat	Jeffrey Allen	James Marshall	New York	Viking Kestrel	1985
Old Mother Hubbard and Her Wonderful Dog	James Marshall	James Marshall	New York	Farrar, Straus & Giroux	1991
Plink Plink Plink	Byrd Baylor	James Marshall	Boston	Houghton Mifflin	1971
Pocket Full of Nonsense	James Marshall	James Marshall	New York	Golden Books	1992
Portly McSwine	James Marshall	James Marshall	Boston	Houghton Mifflin	1979
Rats on the Range	James Marshall	James Marshall	New York	Dial Books for Young Readers	1993
Rats on the Roof	James Marshall	James Marshall	New York	Dial Books for Young Readers	1991
Rapscallion Jones	James Marshall	James Marshall	New York	Viking	1983
Red Riding Hood	James Marshall	James Marshall	New York	Dial	1987
Roger's Umbrella	Daniel Pinkwater	James Marshall	New York	Dutton	1982
Space Case	Edward Marshall	James Marshall	New York	Dial	1980
Speedboat	James Marshall	James Marshall	Middletown, Connecticut	Xerox Education Publications	1976
Sing Out, Irene	James Marshall	James Marshall	Boston	Houghton Mifflin	1975
Snake, His Story	James Marshall	James Marshall	Boston	Houghton Mifflin Co.	1975
Someone is Talking About Hortense	Laurette Murdock	James Marshall	Boston	Houghton	1975
Swine Lake	James Marshall	Maurice Sendak	New York	HarperCollins	1999
Taking Care of Carruthers	James Marshall	James Marshall	Boston	Houghton	1981
The Night Before Christmas	Clement C. Moore	James Marshall	New York	Scholastic	1985
The Owl and the Pussycat	Edward Lear	James Marshall	S.l.	HarperCollins	1991
The Adventures of Isabel: a Verse	Ogden Nash	James Marshall	Boston	Little, Brown	1991
The Big Jump / el salto	James Marshall	James Marshall	Boston	Houghton Mifflen	1981
The Boy Who Cried Wolf	Freya Littledale	James Marshall	New York	Scholastic	1975
The Cut-ups	James Marshall	James Marshall	New York	Viking Kestrel	1984
The Cut-ups at Camp Custer	James Marshall	James Marshall	New York	Viking Penguin	1989
The Cut-ups Carry On	James Marshall	James Marshall	New York	Viking	1990
The Cut-ups Crack Up	James Marshall	James Marshall	New York	Viking Penguin	1992
The Cut-ups Cut Loose	James Marshall	James Marshall	New York	Viking Kestrel	1987
The Frog Prince	Edith H. Tarcov	James Marshall	New York	Scholastic	1974
The Exploding Frog and Other Fables From Aesop	John McFarland	James Marshall	Boston	Little, Brown	1981
The Piggy in the Puddle	Charlotte Pomerantz	James Marshall	New York	Simon & Schuster	1974
The Stupids Die	Harry Allard	James Marshall	Boston	Houghton Mifflin	1981
The Stupids Have a Ball	Harry Allard	James Marshall	Boston	Houghton Mifflin	1978
The Stupids Step Out	Harry Allard	James Marshall	Boston	Houghton Mifflin	1974
The Stupids Take Off	Harry Allard	James Marshall	Boston	Houghton Mifflin	1989
The Three Little Pigs	James Marshall	James Marshall	New York	Dial	1989
There's a Party at Mona's Tonight	Harry Allard	James Marshall	Garden City	Doubleday	1981
Three by the Sea	Edward Marshall	James Marshall	New York	Dial Press	1981
Three Up a Tree	James Marshall	James Marshall	New York	Dial	1986
Troll Country	Edward Marshall	James Marshall	New York	Dial	1980
What's the Matter With Carruthers	James Marshall	James Marshall	Boston	Houghton Mifflin	1972
Willis	James Marshall	James Marshall	Boston	Houghton Mifflin	1974
Wings: a Tale of Two Chickens	James Marshall	James Marshall	New York	Viking	1986
Yummers!	James Marshall	James Marshall	Boston	Houghton Mifflin	1972
Yummers Too: the Second Course	James Marshall	James Marshall	Boston	Houghton Mifflin	1986
