= Daylight (1996 film) =

- Theatrical release poster
- Directed by: Rob Cohen
- Written by: Leslie Bohem
- Produced by: John Davis; David T. Friendly; Joseph M. Singer
- Starring: Sylvester Stallone; Amy Brenneman; Viggo Mortensen; Dan Hedaya; Jay O. Sanders; Karen Young; Claire Bloom; Barry Newman; Stan Shaw
- Cinematography: David Eggby
- Edited by: Peter Amundson
- Music by: Randy Edelman
- Production company: Davis Entertainment
- Distributed by: Universal Pictures
- Release date: December 6, 1996 (United States)
- Running time: 114 minutes
- Country: United States
- Language: English
- Budget: $80 million
- Box office: $159 million

Daylight is a 1996 American disaster film directed by Rob Cohen and starring Sylvester Stallone, Amy Brenneman, Viggo Mortensen, Dan Hedaya, Stan Shaw, Jay O. Sanders, Karen Young and Danielle Harris. The plot follows a group of people trapped inside a collapsed roadway tunnel beneath the Hudson River in Manhattan, as they struggle to escape to safety.

Daylight was released by Universal Pictures on December 6, 1996, in the United States and on December 26 in the United Kingdom. The film received mixed reviews and grossed $159 million worldwide.

== Plot ==
In upstate New York, barrels of volatile toxic waste are loaded onto trucks to be illegally disposed of at a site in New Jersey. The trucks enter a tunnel beneath the Hudson River along with other commuters, including struggling playwright Maddy Thompson, a bus of juvenile offenders, a vacationing family, an elderly couple with a dog, and athlete Roy Nord. Meanwhile, a gang steals a briefcase of gems and flees by car into the tunnel, pursued by the New York City Police Department (NYPD) after the gang are tracked by the victim's Electroguard-protected car. The gang loses control of their vehicle and crashes into one of the waste trucks, causing an explosive blast that seals the tunnel off from the outside, fills it with toxic gas, and kills dozens of commuters.

Caught on the outside of the tunnel collapse, former New York City Emergency Medical Services Chief Kit Latura, now working as a taxi driver, rushes to help whomever he can. Encountering his former EMS colleagues, Kit suggests intentionally collapsing the roof to protect the trapped survivors from the fumes, but is dismissed by their commander, Wilson, who is killed when the unstable tunnel collapses further. Kit enters the sealed tunnel through the ventilation system, risking his life as the fans can be slowed down for only a short time.

Survivors band around Nord, who believes that he can exit through the mid-river passage, a service corridor running between the north and south tubes. Kit arrives and warns Nord that the passage could soon come down, but Nord dismisses the possibility. Kit escapes as the passage collapses, killing Nord and causing another explosion which kills a juvenile offender.

Water begins seeping in from the river above, and Kit uses an explosive to stop the leak. Police officer George Tyrell returns from investigating the Manhattan end and is crushed under a truck as the road shifts. The group frees him before he can drown, but he is left with a broken neck. The water level continues to rise, and the angry survivors confront Kit. He claims that he can slow it down but not stop it, as the clean-up effort on the Manhattan side of the tunnel is causing water to enter their side. There are sleeping quarters beside the tunnels (leftover from the tunnel's construction), and Kit asks George how to access them. Kit finds one by swimming under a security booth and leads the group to this area, but George has to be left behind. He gives Kit a bracelet intended for his girlfriend Grace.

Elderly survivor Eleanor is distressed that her late son's dog Cooper is missing. She refuses to go on, then passes away, presumably from hypothermia. The group moves to another room as the first one floods, convincing Eleanor's husband Roger to come with them. As they reach the top of an old wooden staircase, Kit notices Cooper swimming in the water below and dives down to rescue him, passing him up to a survivor, but a beam falls and destroys the lower half, sending Kit into the water. Maddy tries to help Kit up, but she falls as well, as more of the staircase is knocked down. Kit orders the rest of the group to leave. The majority of the group escape through a manhole into daylight while the corridor caves in behind them, leaving Kit and Maddy behind in the rising water.

Kit and Maddy swim around looking for an exit, with the main highway tunnel now almost completely submerged. Kit realizes that he will have to use his explosives to cause a "blowout" and rip the tunnel roof open. A mass of mud crushes Kit, and Maddy tries to pull him out. The blast forces Maddy towards the surface, but Kit gets stuck in the mud. Maddy finds a barely conscious Kit and keeps him afloat as a boat discovers them offshore. Lying on a stretcher, Kit sees Grace in the crowd and hands her George's bracelet. Maddy insists on riding with him in the ambulance; Kit agrees, but suggests on one condition: “We gotta take the bridge.”

== Cast ==
- Sylvester Stallone as Chief Kit Latura, a disgraced former New York City Emergency Medical Services (EMS) chief who tries to save the survivors trapped inside the sewer tunnel. Rob Cohen originally wanted Nicolas Cage to play Kit Latura, but Universal execs felt he was more of a "character actor", and Stallone was more commercially viable
- Amy Brenneman as Madelyne Thompson, a struggling playwright who was moving out of New York City when the tunnel explosion traps her inside
- Viggo Mortensen as Roy Nord, a rich sports celebrity known for doing commercials for sports company Territory Beyond who is trapped in the tunnel after an explosion
- Dan Hedaya as Frank Kraft, an alternate chief EMS medic who is an estranged friend of Kit after Frank's brother was killed under Kit's watch a year before
- Jay O. Sanders as Steven Crighton, a family man taking his wife and daughter to New York to patch up his strained relationship with his family when the explosion traps all three in the tunnel
- Karen Young as Sarah Crighton, Steven's wife and Ashley's mother who is trapped in the tunnel along with them by the explosion
- Claire Bloom as Eleanor Trilling, Roger's wife who is trapped alongside her husband and family dog in the tunnel when the explosion seals them inside
- Vanessa Bell Calloway as Grace, a tunnel operations dispatcher whose boyfriend police officer George Tyrell is trapped inside the tunnel
- Renoly Santiago as Mikey, a shy juvenile delinquent going to juvenile prison when the explosion traps him and other delinquents in the Holland Tunnel
- Colin Fox as Roger Trilling, an elderly man trapped alongside his wife Eleanor and their late son's dog Cooper in the tunnel
- Danielle Harris as Ashley Crighton, Steven and Sarah's 14-year-old daughter who is trapped alongside her distanced parents in the tunnel
- Trina McGee as Latonya, a female juvenile delinquent trapped along with other trouble youths at the tunnel
- Marcello Thedford as Kadeem, a young juvenile hoodlum arrested for armed robbery who is also trapped with the others
- Sage Stallone as Vincent, a juvenile hoodlum arrested for being a con-artist who becomes Ashley's love interest
- Jo Anderson as Bloom, an EMS search-and-rescue paramedic
- Mark Rolston as Chief Dennis Wilson, an antagonistic EMS chief who replaced Kit after his dismissal
- Rosemary Forsyth as Ms. London, an arrogant head of New York's engineering company
- Luoyong Wang as Gem Dealer
- Lee Oakes as a grunge, robs the gem dealer
- Barry Newman as Norman Bassett, the tunnel operations supervisor
- Stan Shaw as George Tyrell, a transit cop trapped in the tunnel by the explosion

== Production ==
=== Filming ===
Principal photography for Daylight was conducted at Cinecittà Studios in Rome, Italy, where the majority of the tunnel sequences were filmed. Additional location shooting took place in New York City.

== Music ==
Donna Summer and Bruce Roberts sang the theme song, "Whenever There Is Love". Billboard reported that R&B singers Chanté Moore and Tamia were to duet on the film's title song "Daylight," a Vassal Benford-penned "dreamy, heartfelt tune" that was set to lead the album's soundtrack. It was left unused however.

== Release ==
=== Home media ===
Daylight was released on VHS and LaserDisc by MCA/Universal Home Video on May 20, 1997, with the LaserDisc edition featuring a digital DTS soundtrack. The film was later released on DVD on May 26, 1998. The DVD included bonus features such as the film's theatrical trailer, language selection options, and a director's commentary.

== Reception ==
=== Box office ===
Daylight opened in 2,175 theaters across North America, earning $10 million in its opening weekend and ranking second behind 101 Dalmatians. The film went on to gross $33 million in the United States after 55 weeks of release, and earned an additional $126.2 million internationally, bringing its worldwide total to $159.2 million.

=== Critical response ===
On the review aggregator Rotten Tomatoes, Daylight holds an approval rating of 28% based on 46 reviews, with an average score of 5/10. The site's consensus reads: "The opening's got a great fiery explosion and Sylvester Stallone puts in another earnest, sympathetic performance, but all else in Daylight feels designed to annoy the audience into submission." Metacritic, which uses a weighted average, assigned the film a score of 47 out of 100, based on 19 critics, indicating "mixed or average" reviews. Audiences surveyed by CinemaScore gave the film an average grade of "B" on an A+ to F scale.

Roger Ebert gave the film 2 out of 4 stars, describing it as "the cinematic equivalent of a golden oldies station," noting its familiarity and lack of originality. Empire gave the film 4 out of 5 stars, praising its simplicity and special effects, and stating, "Daylight is great because it never tries to be any more than it is — a disaster movie with all the special-effects hoopla the '90s can bring." The film's musical score by Randy Edelman received positive mention in several reviews.

Reflecting on the film, Stallone later commented, "The premise was really good, but it didn't deliver."

=== Accolades ===
Daylight won a Golden Reel Award for Best Sound Editing and was nominated for the Academy Award for Best Sound Editing (Richard L. Anderson and David A. Whittaker). It also received two Golden Raspberry Award nominations: Worst Actor (Sylvester Stallone) and Worst Original Song ("Whenever There Is Love"). At the 1996 Stinkers Bad Movie Awards, Stallone was again nominated for Worst Actor.

The film is also noted for introducing the Panerai "Daylight" wristwatch line, which was created at the request of Stallone and featured prominently in the film.

== Novelization ==
A novelization of the film, titled Daylight, was written by Max Allan Collins and released in 1996 to coincide with the film's theatrical debut.
