= Harry Allard =

American writer (1928–2017)

- Born: January 27, 1928; Evanston, Illinois, U.S.
- Died: February 1, 2017 (aged 89)
- Education: Northwestern University, Middlebury College, and Yale University
- Occupation: Writer
- Writing career
- Genre: Children's literature

Harry Allard (January 27, 1928 – February 1, 2017) was an American writer of children's books. Many of his books have received awards; a few have also been banned and challenged in the United States.

Allard was born in Evanston, Illinois on January 27, 1928. He received a bachelor's degree from Northwestern University in 1949, a master's degree in French from Middlebury College, and a doctorate in French literature from Yale in 1952.

== Selected texts ==
=== Miss Nelson series ===
The Miss Nelson series tells the story of the misbehaving elementary school kids in the homeroom of the titular Miss Nelson and reminds readers to show appreciation for the people they value. The series includes the books Miss Nelson is Missing, Miss Nelson is Back, and Miss Nelson Has a Field Day.

Miss Nelson is Missing!, a collaboration with fellow children's book author and illustrator James Marshall, was published September 9, 1977 by Houghton Mifflin. The book received the following accolades:

- Georgia Children's Book Award for K-4 (1979)
- Edgar Award Nominee for Best Juvenile (1978)
- Grand Canyon Reader Award (1981)
- California Young Readers Medal for Primary (1982)

Miss Nelson Is Back was published 1982 by Houghton Mifflin Company.

Miss Nelson Has a Field Day was originally published January 1, 1985 by Clarion Books, then republished October 24, 1988 by Houghton Mifflin. The book was made into a short film on March 4, 1999 by Weston Woods Studios.

The book received the following accolades:

- Kirkus Starred Review (1985)
- Flicker Tale Children's Book Award (1988)
- Andrew Carnegie Medal (2000)
- Association for Library Service to Children Notable Children's Videos (2000)

=== The Stupids series ===
The Stupids series, written by Harry Allard and illustrated by James Marshall, tells multiple stories about the Stupid family. The series includes the books The Stupids Step Out. The Stupids Have a Ball, The Stupids Die, and The Stupids Take Off.

The Stupids Die received the Grand Canyon Reader Award in 1985.

The series has often been the center of controversy and has landed on the American Library Association's list of the top 100 banned and challenged books in the United States from 1990 to 1999 (27), as well as 2000 to 2009 (62).

=== Bumps in the Night ===
Bumps in the Night, illustrated by James Marshall, was first published September 1st 1979, then republished September 1, 1996 by Yearling. According to the American Library Association, the book was one of the most banned and challenged books in the United States between 1990 and 1999 (56), as well as 2000 and 2009 (93).

=== It's So Nice to Have a Wolf Around the House ===
It's So Nice to Have a Wolf Around the House, illustrated by James Marshall, was first published in 1977 by Doubleday, then republished March 10, 1997 by Yearling. The book was nominated for California Young Readers Medal in 1983. The book was made into a short film by the Learning Corporation of America in 1979, which was named to the ALA Notable Children's Videos list that year.
