= Carpool (1996 film) =

- Theatrical release poster
- Directed by: Arthur Hiller
- Written by: Don Rhymer
- Produced by: Arnon Milchan; Michael G. Nathanson
- Starring: Tom Arnold; David Paymer; Rhea Perlman; Rachael Leigh Cook; Rod Steiger
- Cinematography: David M. Walsh
- Edited by: M. James Langlois; William H. Reynolds
- Music by: John Debney
- Production company: Regency Enterprises
- Distributed by: Warner Bros.
- Release date: August 23, 1996
- Running time: 89 minutes
- Country: United States
- Language: English
- Budget: $17 million
- Box office: $3.3 million

Carpool is a 1996 American comedy film directed by Arthur Hiller, written by Don Rhymer, starring Tom Arnold and David Paymer. It was theatrically released with Superior Duck as the preceding cartoon.

Carpool was released by Warner Bros. on August 23, 1996. The film received negative reviews from critics and was a box office bomb, grossing $3.3 million against a $17 million budget. The film is currently owned by the Walt Disney Studios through 20th Century Studios, which obtained the copyrights to 52 films from Regency Enterprises on June 22, 2021.

== Plot ==
Workaholic Daniel Miller is forced to drive his sons, Bucky and Andrew, to school when his wife, Diane, falls ill with a stomach bug. He is in the middle of a huge advertising campaign for Hammerman's, a large chain of gourmet markets, and initially refuses the drive until Diane guilts him. Along with Bucky and Andrew, two local girls; Kayla and her younger sister, Chelsea, as well as local weirdo Travis, join Daniel's reluctant carpool. Meanwhile, Franklin Laszlo, owner of the failing Laszlo Brothers Carnival, reluctantly decides to commit armed robbery in order to get the money to keep his business open. As he leaves to attempt it, he enters a local Hammerman's where Daniel is purchasing baked goods for the children. A duo of gunmen named Neil and Jerry also plan to rob the market by coincidence. When they hold it up, a standoff ensues between them, Franklin, an old woman, and off-duty local detective Lt. Erdman. Through a series of misunderstandings, Franklin ends up taking Daniel as his hostage and escaping with the money Neil and Jerry had stolen from the market's safe. Heading to the van, Franklin ends up kidnapping Daniel and the children. The group eventually bonds with one another through a series of misadventures; stopping at a hair salon so Andrew can use the restroom, evading the police with disguises, and eventually being chased by Martha, an obsessive meter maid. Franklin reveals to the group that the reason behind his robbery and kidnapping was that he desperately needed the money so he could keep his business open and give his son, Keith, who lives with his ex-wife, a present for his 12th birthday.

Eventually, Franklin takes the group to his carnival, where the children enjoy the rides. Neil and Jerry arrive soon after, having tracked Franklin through his wallet, which he dropped in Hammerman's, and demand the grocery money. A fight ensues, with the controls to the Ferris wheel being damaged. Daniel uses his presentation materials to jam the ride's mechanism and climbs up to rescue Andrew. Franklin ties up Neil and Jerry, locks them in the Zipper, and gets his wallet back. Daniel realizes that he's far too late to attend his pitch meeting, but Franklin manages to convince him otherwise. He arrives at the office hours late and greatly unprepared, but he uses his experience to successfully convince Mr. Hammerman that children don't like his chain, and that a revamp to something more kid-friendly would help. Franklin likes the idea as Daniel gains the backbone to tell Mr. Hammerman that he quits. Eventually, Erdman and the police arrive to arrest Franklin, but they soon let him go when Daniel reveals why he tried to rob the market and doesn't want to press charges. Sometime later, Franklin and Daniel have become co-owners of the carnival, with Mr. Hammerman supplying the food. Everything seems to be all right at the end, until Franklin realizes that he missed a lunch date with his mother, who is seen destroying a local Sizzler over the closing credits.

== Cast ==
- Tom Arnold as Franklin Laszlo
- David Paymer as Daniel Miller
- Rhea Perlman as Officer Martha
- Kim Coates as Lieutenant Erdman
- Obba Babatundé as Jeffery
- Rachael Leigh Cook as Kayla
- Rod Steiger as Mr. Hammerman
- Micah Gardener as Bucky Miller, Daniel's first son and Kayla's love interest
- Jordan Blake Warkol as Travis
- Mikey Kovar as Andrew Miller, Daniel's second son
- Colleen Rennison as Chelsea, Kayla's younger sister
- Ian Tracey as Neil
- John Tench as Jerry
- Stellina Rusich as Diane Miller, Daniel's wife
- David Kaye as Scott Lewis
- Edie McClurg, Kathleen Freeman, and Miriam Flynn as Voice of Franklin's Mom

== Production ==
The film was directed by Arthur Hiller. Hiller was also the president of the Academy of Motion Picture Arts and Sciences at that time. The script was written by Don Rhymer.. The film was shot throughout Vancouver.

== Reception ==
=== Box office ===
The film opened theatrically on August 23, 1996, in 1,487 venues nationwide and earned $1,628,482 in its first weekend, ranking thirteenth in the domestic box office. At the end of its run, it had grossed $3,325,651. Based on an estimated $17 million budget, it was a box office bomb.

=== Critical response ===
The film was not screened in advance for critics and received minimal promotion. On Rotten Tomatoes, it has a score of 13% based on 23 reviews, with an average rating of 2.6/10. The site's consensus states: "Not even an HOV lane amid a traffic jam is worth boarding this aggravating and unfunny Carpool." On Metacritic the film has a score of 15 out of 100 based on reviews from 10 critics, indicating "overwhelming dislike". Audiences surveyed by CinemaScore gave the film a grade of B− on scale of A to F.

Ty Burr for Entertainment Weekly calls the film "Hard to hate, but just about impossible to like" and gives it grade D+. Variety called it: "Low-tech, high-volume slapstick, "Carpool" is a ramshackle if amiable chase comedy that should have some appeal for end-of-summer family outings." Janet Maslin, of The New York Times, pointed out that the supporting characters, especially Rhea Perlman, end up standing out with more pleasant moments when compared to the performance of Tom Arnold. Rita Kempley of The Washington Post, emphasizes that in contrast to the character of Daniel who discovers that life should be fun, the film is not the same for the viewer.

=== Accolades ===
Arnold tied with Pauly Shore for a 1996 Razzie Award in part for his role in the film as well as for Big Bully and The Stupids. He also won Worst Actor for the same movies at the 1996 Stinkers Bad Movie Awards; said movies were also dishonourable mentions for Worst Picture.
