= Big Bully (film) =

- Theatrical release poster
- Directed by: Steve Miner
- Written by: Mark Steven Johnson
- Produced by: Gary Foster; Lee Rich; James G. Robinson; Gary Barber; Dylan Sellers
- Starring: Rick Moranis; Tom Arnold; Julianne Phillips; Carol Kane; Jeffrey Tambor; Don Knotts
- Cinematography: Daryn Okada
- Edited by: Marshall Harvey
- Music by: David Newman
- Production company: Morgan Creek Productions
- Distributed by: Warner Bros.
- Release date: January 26, 1996
- Running time: 91 minutes
- Country: United States
- Language: English
- Budget: $15 million
- Box office: $2 million

Big Bully is a 1996 American black comedy film directed by Steve Miner, written by Mark Steven Johnson and starring Rick Moranis and Tom Arnold as two men, a childhood bully and his victim, as they reconnect as adults.

Big Bully was released by Warner Bros. on January 26, 1996. It was panned by critics and was a box-office bomb, earning only $2 million from a $15 million budget. It was Rick Moranis' last on-screen role in a theatrical release, prior to his long hiatus from acting.

Although the film is set in Minnesota, it was actually filmed in Vancouver and Ladysmith, British Columbia, Canada. The school scenes were filmed at the Kitsilano Secondary School in Vancouver.

== Plot ==
Growing up in Hastings, Minnesota in 1970, young David Leary was bullied by Roscoe Bigger, nicknamed "Fang" because of a pointed tooth. David is ecstatic when his parents announce they are moving to Oakland. David informs teachers about Fang stealing a moon rock and Fang is arrested.

Twenty-six years later in 1996, David is divorced and raising his troubled son Ben as a single parent. A published author (albeit not a popular one), David jumps at an offer from his old school to teach creative writing for the fall semester. He meets wacko neighbors Art and Betty Lundstrum and begins rekindling a relationship with his old flame Victoria. He also encounters the school librarian Mrs. Rumpert who is still waiting for David to return Green Eggs and Ham to the library. After Ben begins picking on a kid named Kirby, David meets the boy's father Ross Bigger when both are called to the office of Principal Kokelar. Following a fire drill, David meets with his old friend Ulf, a fire fighter. When meeting with Ulf, Alan, and Gerry at a bar, David learns that after Ross got out of juvenile hall, Ross' parents skipped town which led to him growing up in an orphanage.

When Ross learns who David is, he resumes his old routine of bullying him to make himself feel better. Ross drops his mild-mannered, pushover attitude and begins taking charge in his classroom and home. David's son begins bullying Ross' son, but after a discussion, they become friends. Ross' intimidation tactics cause David to become paranoid, which unnerves another teacher named Clark, who thinks David is on crack. When David brings Ross' actions to Principal Kokelar after a recent pranking, the principal sides with Ross due to his seniority at the school and reveals that he has gotten some complaints from Clark about David. He warns David that if he can't straighten up his act, he will get another teacher to cover for him for the remainder of the semester.

Later that night, David and Ross meet at the old see-saw, where Ross reaffirms that David has never stood up for himself, while David admits snitching to get Ross put in juvenile hall. After a game of cat-and-mouse in the school after hours, David flees to his old childhood hiding place in a cave. Ross chases him onto a waterfall and tells David that he always thought of him as a friend, before attacking him. David hits Ross with a piece of driftwood causing him to fall into the river. Fearing that he has killed his enemy, David tries to turn himself over to the police, only to find that the cops are out. Ulf drives David to his home while he tries to find Ross' body. After a talk with Art, David attempts to go to sleep only to be ambushed by Ross. The two men fight once again until Kirby and Ben come in and reveal that they've made up and encourage their fathers to do the same. Ross reveals he stole the moon rock because he wanted to be an astronaut. It is also shown that during their recent fight, Ross' "fang" was chipped. They finally patch things up.

After finishing the semester and with nothing left for him in Hastings, Minnesota, David begins to pack up to move to New York. He has Victoria return Green Eggs and Ham to the school library for him. Ross arrives and has a goodbye present for David: an Evel Knievel action figure identical to the one David had as a child before Ross threw it into a river. David invites them to visit, and the changed family leaves. Ross hooks up his mobile home to his truck, and follows David, telling his family they have been "invited" to come to New York and that's why they call it a "mobile home."

== Cast ==
- Rick Moranis as David Leary
  - Justin Jon Ross as young David Leary
- Tom Arnold as Roscoe "Fang" Bigger
  - Michael Zwiener as young Roscoe "Fang" Bigger
- Julianne Phillips as Victoria Tucker, David's love interest
  - Tiffany Foster as young Victoria Tucker
- Carol Kane as Faith Bigger, Roscoe's wife
- Jeffrey Tambor as Art Lundstrum
- Curtis Armstrong as Clark
- Faith Prince as Betty Lundstrum, Art's wife
- Tony Pierce as Ulf
  - Matthew Slowik as young Ulf
- Don Knotts as Principal Kokelar
- Blake Bashoff as Ben Leary, David's son
- Cody McMains as Kirby Bigger, Roscoe & Faith's son
- Harry Waters, Jr. as Alan
  - C. J. Grayson as young Alan
- Stuart Pankin as Gerry
  - Grant Hoover as young Gerry
- Bill Dow as Mr. Leary, David's father
- Susan Bain as Mrs. Leary, David's mother
- Norma MacMillan as Mrs. Rumpert
- Alf Humphreys as Teacher
- Miriam Smith as Crying teacher
- Gregory Smith as Kid #2
- Tegan Moss as Girl in class
- Alexander Pollock as Corky
- Kyle Labine as Stevie

== Production ==
In October 1992, the first 29 pages of the Mark Steven Johnson spec script Big Bullies were sold to Warner Bros. Pictures, described as The War of the Roses in a corporate office with the story originally following a young television executive whose bully from grade school is hired by the network boss to step up inner office competition.

In January 1993, it was announced the script, now titled Big Bully, had been acquired by Warner Bros. for Lee Rich Productions. In April 1995, Morgan Creek Entertainment announced the film had begun production starting in February with Tom Arnold and Rick Moranis for the leads. In July of that year, it was reported that Arnold had taken a day off from his The Stupids to perform a day's worth of reshoots on Big Bully.

== Reception ==
The film was a box-office bomb, grossing only $2,042,530 from an estimated $15 million budget.

The film was a critical failure, with a 0% rating on Rotten Tomatoes based on reviews from 8 critics. Lisa Schwarzbaum of Entertainment Weekly gave the film a grade of C and wrote: "within its genre (i.e., corny dum-dum comedies ostensibly appealing to young boys but actually appealing to their 35-year-old movie-exec dads nostalgic for their childhoods), [the film] is not a big stinker. There are a few satisfyingly funny lines of dialogue, and there are two sly throwaway appearances."

Audiences surveyed by CinemaScore gave the film a grade of "C" on a scale of A+ to F.

Arnold tied with Pauly Shore for a 1996 Razzie Award in part for his role in Big Bully as well as for Carpool and The Stupids. He also "won" Worst Actor for the same movies at the 1996 Stinkers Bad Movie Awards; said movies were also dishonourable mentions for Worst Picture.
