= List of awards and honors received by Donald Trump =

This following is a list of awards and honors received by Donald Trump, a businessman, TV personality, 45th and 47th president of the United States.

This list does not include most awards for Trump's media and film appearances and roles or awards for media about or depicting Trump, such as the Academy Award nomination for Sebastian Stan's role as Trump in the 2024 film The Apprentice.

== Awards, recognitions and accolades ==
=== International ===
- Georgia
  - Presidential Order of Excellence (2012)
- Saudi Arabia
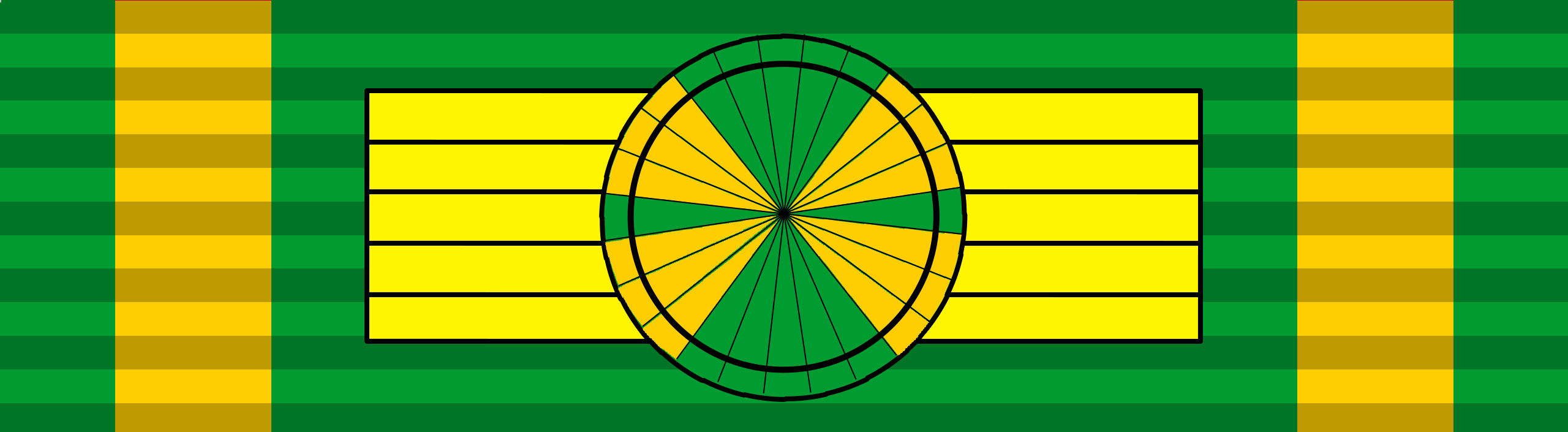
  - Collar of The Order of Abdulaziz al Saud (Class I) (2017)
- Kosovo
  - Medal of the Order of Freedom (2020)
- Morocco
  - Collar of the Order of Muhammad (2021)
- United Arab Emirates
  - Collar of the Order of Zayed (2025)
- Egypt
  - Collar of the Order of the Nile (2025)
- Israel
  - Israeli Presidential Medal of Honour (2025)
  - Israel Prize (2026)
- South Korea
  - Grand Order of Mugunghwa (2025)

=== Organizational ===
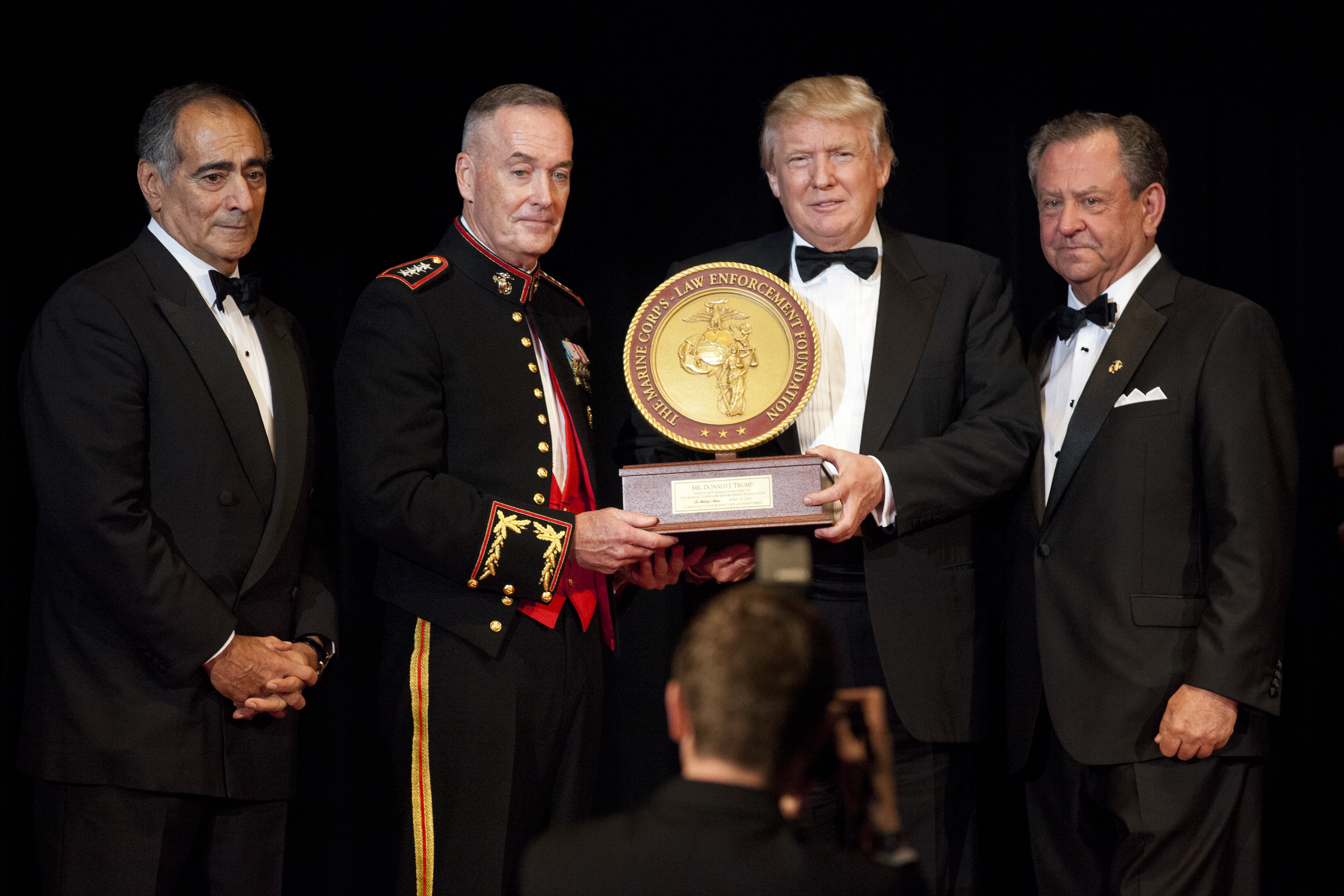
Trump receiving the 2015 Marine Corps–Law Enforcement Foundation's annual Commandant's Leadership Award

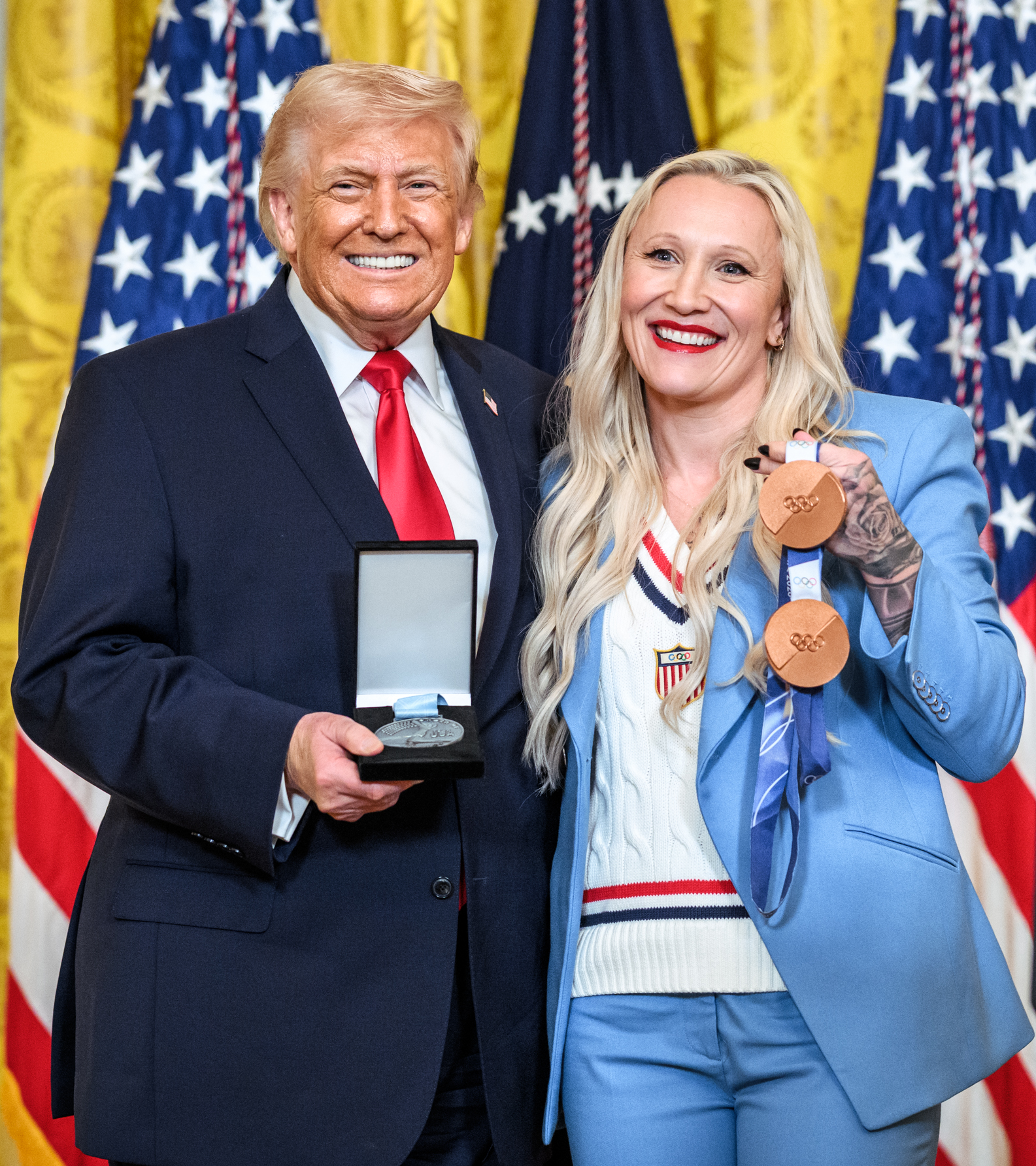
Trump receiving the Order of Ikkos medal from Kaillie Humphries in 2026

- National Jewish Hospital's Humanitarian Award (1976)
- Jewish National Fund's Tree of Life Award (1983)
- Ellis Island Medal of Honor (1986)
- Freedoms Foundation's President's Medal (1995)
- Muhammad Ali Entrepreneur Award (2007)
- Unicorn Children's Foundation's Shining Star Award (2008)
- Palm Beach Police Foundation's Palm Tree Award (2010)
- Lois Pope LIFE Foundation's Presidential Hero Award (2011)
- The Algemeiner's Liberty Award (2015)
- Marine Corps–Law Enforcement Foundation's Commandant's Leadership Award (2015)
- The Friends of Zion Museum's Friends of Zion Award (2017)
- 20/20 Bipartisan Justice Center's Bipartisan Justice Award (2019)
- Richard Nixon Foundation's Architect of Peace Award (2025)
- FIFA Peace Prize (2025)
- Washington Coal Club's Undisputed Champion of Beautiful Clean Coal Award (2026)
- Order of Ikkos (2026)
- National Republican Congressional Committee's America First Award (2026)
- Grand Cross of the Order of the Holy Sepulchre (Greek Orthodox Patriarchate of Jerusalem) (2026)

==== Revoked ====
- Appointed GlobalScot Ambassador (2006). Appointment revoked by the Scottish government in 2015.

=== Halls of fame ===
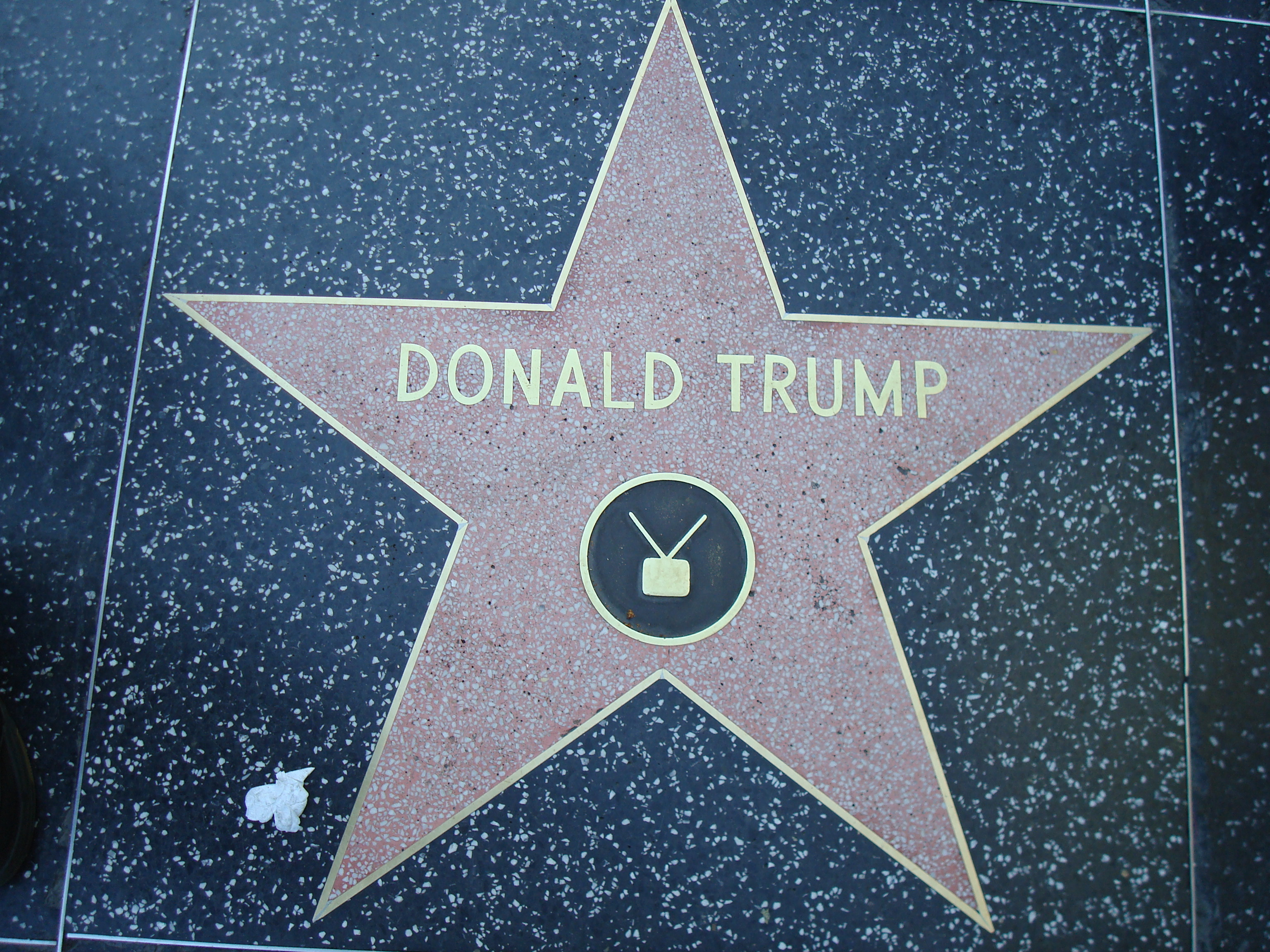
Trump's star on the Hollywood Walk of Fame

- Gaming Hall of Fame (1995)
- Star on the Hollywood Walk of Fame in the Television Category (2007)
- German American Hall of Fame (2012)
- WWE Hall of Fame (2013)
- New Jersey Boxing Hall of Fame (2015)
- Atlantic City Boxing Hall of Fame (2018)

=== Media ===
- Two-time Time Person of the Year (2016, 2024)
- Two-time Financial Times Person of the Year (2016, 2024)
- Sports Business Journal Most Influential Person in Sports Business (2017)
- Two-time Gallup Poll Most Admired Man (2019 – shared with Barack Obama, 2020)
- Fox Nation Patriot of the Year (2024)

=== Other ===
- McDonald's French Fry Certification Pin, awarded by Chuck Edwards (2024) (Note: This is an honorary award, and not an actual certification given by the McDonald's Corporation.)

== Honorary degrees ==
- Liberty University – Doctor of Business Administration (2012)
- Liberty University – Doctor of Laws (2017)

=== Revoked ===
- Robert Gordon University – Doctor of Business Administration (conferred 2010; revoked 2015)
- Lehigh University – Doctor of Laws (conferred 1988; revoked 2021)
- Wagner College – Doctor of Humane Letters (conferred 2004; rescinded 2021)

== Satirical ==
- Golden Raspberry Award for Worst Supporting Actor (1990, for Ghosts Can't Do It)
- Golden Raspberry Award for Worst Actor (2019, for Death of a Nation and Fahrenheit 11/9)
- Golden Raspberry Award for Worst Screen Combo (2019, Donald Trump & "His Self-perpetuating Pettiness", Death of a Nation and Fahrenheit 11/9)
- Foot in Mouth Award (2015)
- Ig Nobel Prize in medical education (shared with Jair Bolsonaro, Boris Johnson, Narendra Modi, Andrés Manuel López Obrador, Alexander Lukashenko, Recep Tayyip Erdoğan, Vladimir Putin, and Gurbanguly Berdimuhamedow) (2020)

== See also ==
- List of things named after Donald Trump
