= Donald Trump filmography =

Performances by President of the US

Before his first election as president of the United States, Donald Trump had produced and hosted reality TV shows The Apprentice and The Celebrity Apprentice from 2004 to 2015. He also made dozens of cameo appearances in films, television series, and advertisements since the 1980s. He won the Worst Supporting Actor award at the 11th Golden Raspberry Awards for Ghosts Can't Do It in 1990, as well as awards for Worst Actor and Worst Screen Combo at the 39th Golden Raspberry Awards for his roles in the documentary films Death of a Nation and Fahrenheit 11/9 in 2019.

== Appearances by Trump ==
=== Film ===
Title	Year	Role	Notes	Ref.
Ghosts Can't Do It	1989	Himself	First on screen acting appearance	
Home Alone 2: Lost in New York	1992	Himself	Credited as 'Donald Trump' not 'himself'	
The Little Rascals	1994	Waldo Johnston II		
Across the Sea of Time	1995	Himself		
Eddie	1996	Himself		
The Associate	1996	Himself		
54	1998	VIP Patron		
Celebrity	1998	Himself		
New York: A Documentary Film	1999	Himself	Documentary	
Zoolander	2001	Himself		
Two Weeks Notice	2002	Himself		
Le Cirque: A Table in Heaven	2007	Himself	Documentary	
Small Potatoes: Who Killed the USFL?	2009	Himself (Note: 60-minute ESPN documentary film about the United States Football League.)	Documentary	
Wall Street: Money Never Sleeps	2010	Himself (Note: Trump's scene was cut from the theatrical version but is included on the DVD.)		
POM Wonderful Presents: The Greatest Movie Ever Sold	2011	Himself	Documentary	
Melania	2026	Himself	Documentary	

=== Television ===
Title	Year	Role	Notes	Ref.
The Jeffersons (CBS)	1985	Himself	Episode: "You'll Never Get Rich"	
I'll Take Manhattan (CBS)	1987	Himself	Miniseries	
Saint and Greavsie (ITV)	1991	Himself	Trump drew the away teams for the Football League Cup Fifth Round	
The Fresh Prince of Bel-Air (NBC)	1994	Himself	Episode: "For Sale by Owner"	
The Nanny (CBS)	1996	Himself	Episode: "The Rosie Show"	
Suddenly Susan (NBC)	1997	Himself	Episode: "I'll See That and Raise You Susan"	
The Drew Carey Show (ABC)	1997	Himself	Episode: "New York and Queens"	
Night Man (Syndication)	1997	Himself	Episode: "Face to Face"	
Howard Stern	1997-2005	Himself		
Spin City (ABC)	1998	Himself	Episode: "The Paul Lassiter Story"	
Sex and the City (HBO)	1999	Himself	Episode: "The Man, the Myth, the Viagra"	
The Job (ABC)	2001	Himself	Episode: "Elizabeth"	
Da Ali G Show (HBO)	2003	Himself	Episode: "Politics"	
Saturday Night Live (NBC)	2004, 2015	Host; Various imitations Tax Guy (Note: Trump hosted the April 3, 2004 and November 7, 2015 episodes of SNL.)	"Donald Trump/Toots & the Maytals" "Donald Trump/Sia"	
The Apprentice (NBC)	2004–2015	Himself	Producer, Host	
Days of Our Lives (NBC)	2005	Himself	Guest star	
58th Primetime Emmy Awards (NBC)	2006	Oliver Wendell Douglas	Minimusical	
WWE Raw (USA Network)	2007, 2009	Himself	Briefly "owned" Raw	
WrestleMania 23 (Syndication)	2007	Himself	"Battle of the Billionaires" Match	
America: The Story of Us (History)	2010	Himself	Commentor	
Comedy Central Roast (Comedy Central)	2011	Himself	Roastee	
Curiosity (Discovery Channel)	2011	Himself	"What's America Worth?"	
Top Gear USA (BBC)	2012	Himself	Episode: "Supercars"	
The Men Who Built America (History)	2012	Commentator		
Fear City: New York vs the Mafia (Netflix)	2020	Historical footage		

=== Video ===
Trump has appeared in three VHS tapes released by Playboy. He did not appear in any scenes containing nudity or sexual content.

Title	Year	Role	Notes	Ref.
Playboy Centerfold	1994	Himself	Adult film	
Playboy Video Centerfold: Playmate 2000 Bernaola Twins	2000	Himself	Adult film	
Untitled Playboy video	2001	Himself	Fashion show featuring Betsey Johnson	

=== Music videos ===
In 1989, Trump appeared in the music video for Bobby Brown's single "On Our Own", which was featured in the movie Ghostbusters II. In 1991, Trump originally made an appearance in the music video for Precious Metal's cover of Jean Knight's song, "Mr. Big Stuff". However, Trump wanted a $250,000 payment instead of the agreed-upon $10,000 appearance fee. After the band refused to pay for his appearance, Trump was replaced in the final version of the music video.

=== Advertising ===
Trump has also appeared in a number of television commercials for Pizza Hut. The first of these commercials aired in the United States in 1995, and featured him and his ex-wife Ivana promoting Stuffed Crust pizzas. The second of these commercials aired in the Australian market in 2000, and was for large 'New Yorker' pizzas the chain was promoting at the time. In 2002, Trump appeared in three McDonald's commercials featuring Grimace.

Other brands that Trump appeared in commercials for included Pepsi, Macy's, Oreo, Serta, Verizon, and Visa.

== Works about Trump ==
=== Film ===
Title	Year	Distributor	Writer / Producer	Director	Details	Notes
Trump: What's the Deal?	1991	The Deadline Company	Jesse Kornbluth	Libby Handros	Television documentary on Donald Trump's business career, remained unreleased until 2015	
You've Been Trumped	2011	Montrose Pictures	Richard Phinney, Anthony Baxter	Anthony Baxter	Documentary about Trump's construction of a golf course in Balmedie, Aberdeenshire, Scotland. Released on BBC Two	
A Dangerous Game	2014	Montrose Pictures	Richard Phinney	Anthony Baxter	Documentary about the Balmedie golf course and Trump's project on Mount Srđ near Dubrovnik, Croatia	
Donald Trump's The Art of the Deal: The Movie	2016	Funny or Die	Joe Randazzo	Jeremy Konner	Satirical adaptation of Trump's book The Art of the Deal presented as a VHS recording of a television film. Released during the 2016 Republican Party presidential primaries. Johnny Depp play the part of Donald Trump.	
Michael Moore in TrumpLand	2016	Dog Eat Dog Films	Michael Moore		Live one-person show by Moore at the Murphy Theatre in Wilmington, Ohio during the 2016 presidential election	
Trumped: Inside the Greatest Political Upset of All Time	2017	Left/Right Productions	Kevin Vargas, producer	Ted Bourne, Mary Robertson, Banks Tarver	Documentary film on Donald Trump's 2016 presidential campaign. Released at the Sundance Film Festival and premiered on Showtime.	
Fahrenheit 11/9	2018	Briarcliff Entertainment	Michael Moore		Political documentary exploring the factors leading to the first presidency of Donald Trump, as well as events such as the Flint water crisis and gun violence. Compares Trump's electoral victory to Hitler's rise to power and advocates radical overhaul of the U.S. political system.	
Active Measures	2018			Jack Bryan	Documentary exploring allegations of collusion between the Trump campaign and the Russian government during the 2016 election, as well as the history of political warfare by the Soviet Union and the Russian Federation under Vladimir Putin	
Death of a Nation: Can We Save America a Second Time?	2018	Quality Flix	Dinesh D'Souza Bruce Schooley Gerald R. Molen	Dinesh D'Souza Bruce Schooley	Political documentary comparing Trump and U.S. political polarization to Abraham Lincoln during the American Civil War, and accusing the Democratic Party of racism and similarities with the Nazi Party	
BlacKkKlansman	2018	Focus Features	Charlie Wachtel	Spike Lee	Starring Adam Driver and John David Washington. Some real footage of President Trump appears at the end of movie	
Bombshell	2019	Lionsgate Films	Charles Randolph	Jay Roach	Starring Nicole Kidman, Charlize Theron and Margot Robbie. Some real footage of President Trump appears in the movie	
Trump Card	2020	Cloudburst Entertainment	Dinesh D'Souza Debbie D'Souza Bruce Schooley		Political documentary praising Trump and accusing Democratic politicians such as Joe Biden and Bernie Sanders of corruption and socialism. Originally intended to coincide with the 2020 Republican National Convention but delayed due to the COVID-19 pandemic.	
Borat Subsequent Moviefilm	2020	Amazon Studios	Sacha Baron Cohen	Jason Woliner	Mockumentary about the 2020 United States presidential election and the ongoing COVID-19 pandemic	
Da 5 Bloods	2020	Netflix	Danny Bilson	Spike Lee	Starring Chadwick Boseman Some real footage of President Trump appears in the movie	
The Apprentice	2024	Scythia Films	Gabriel Sherman	Ali Abbasi	Starring Sebastian Stan, the film examines Trump's business career	

=== Television ===
Title	Year	Distributor	Writer / Producer	Director		Notes
Trump Unauthorized	2005	Apollo ProMovie GMGH & Co. Filmproduktion KG	Keith Curran	John David Coles	Biographical television film on Donald Trump's life and business career starring Justin Louis as Donald Trump.	
Trump: The Kremlin Candidate?	2017	Panorama, BBC One	John Sweeney, presenter; Andy Blackman, Matthew Hill, Diana Martin, Tomiko Newson, Nick Sturdee, producers	Matthew Hill, Tomiko Newson, Nick Sturdee	Documentary investigating links between Trump associates and Russian officials and the role of Russian interference in the results of the 2016 election.	
Trump: An American Dream	2017	Channel 4 Netflix	David Glover Mark Raphael		Documentary on Trump's entrepreneurial and political careers, as well as his relations with Roger Stone and Roy Cohn	
The Comey Rule	2020	CBS Television Studios	Billy Ray	Billy Ray	American political drama television miniseries, based on the book A Higher Loyalty by former FBI director James Comey. The miniseries stars Jeff Daniels as Comey and Brendan Gleeson as President Donald Trump.	

== Films or TV series alluding to Trump ==
- In the 1989 film Back to the Future Part II, Biff Tannen (Thomas F. Wilson) turns Hill Valley's courthouse into a gaudy casino/hotel (à la the Trump Plaza hotel) where he lives an obnoxiously luxurious lifestyle. In his office is a portrait of himself that was based on one of Donald Trump. Co-writer Bob Gale says that the Trump connection was definitely intentional.

== Awards and nominations ==
=== Golden Raspberry Awards ===
Year	Category	Nominated work	Result	Ref
1990	Worst Supporting Actor	Ghosts Can't Do It	Won	
1990	Worst New Star	Ghosts Can't Do It	Nominated	
2019	Worst Actor	Death of a Nation	Won	
2019	Worst Actor	Fahrenheit 11/9	Won	
2019	Worst Screen Combo	Death of a Nation	Won	
2019	Worst Screen Combo	Fahrenheit 11/9	Won	

=== Primetime Emmy Awards ===
Year	Category	Nominated work	Result	Ref
2004	Outstanding Reality-Competition Program	The Apprentice	Nominated	
2005	Outstanding Reality-Competition Program	The Apprentice	Nominated	

=== Teen Choice Awards ===
Year	Category	Nominated work	Result	Ref
2004	Choice TV: Personality	The Apprentice	Nominated	
2004	Choice TV: Male Reality/Variety Star	The Apprentice	Nominated	

=== The Streamer Awards ===
Year	Category	Nominated work	Result	Ref
2024	Best Marathon Stream	Adin Ross x Donald Trump	Nominated	
