= The Happytime Murders =

2018 film by Brian Henson

- Theatrical release poster
- Directed by: Brian Henson
- Screenplay by: Todd Berger
- Story by: Todd Berger; Dee Austin Robertson
- Produced by: Brian Henson; Jeffrey Hayes; Melissa McCarthy; Ben Falcone
- Starring: Melissa McCarthy; Bill Barretta; Joel McHale; Maya Rudolph; Leslie David Baker; Elizabeth Banks
- Cinematography: Mitchell Amundsen
- Edited by: Brian Olds
- Music by: Christopher Lennertz
- Production companies: STX Films; H. Brothers; Black Bear Pictures; TMP; Henson Alternative; On the Day Productions
- Distributed by: STX Entertainment
- Release date: August 24, 2018
- Running time: 91 minutes
- Country: United States
- Language: English
- Budget: $40–47 million
- Box office: $27.5 million

The Happytime Murders is a 2018 American black comedy film directed by Brian Henson and written by Todd Berger from a story by Berger and Dee Austin Robertson. The film stars Melissa McCarthy, Bill Barretta, Joel McHale, Maya Rudolph, Leslie David Baker, and Elizabeth Banks. Set in a world where humans and living puppets co-exist, the film follows a puppet private investigator and a human police detective who must solve a murder spree of retired sitcom stars.

The film was first announced in 2008 by The Jim Henson Company, the production studio of Muppets creator Jim Henson. Various actors, including Cameron Diaz, Katherine Heigl and Jamie Foxx, were approached to star before McCarthy signed on in May 2017. Filming began in Los Angeles that September, and involved the use of over 120 puppets. The Happytime Murders was the first and only film released by Henson Alternative, a banner of The Jim Henson Company aimed toward adult audiences.

The Happytime Murders was released on August 24, 2018, by STX Entertainment. It received negative reviews from critics and it was a box-office failure, grossing $27.5 million worldwide against a $40–47 million budget. The film received six nominations at the 39th Golden Raspberry Awards, including Worst Picture, with McCarthy winning Worst Actress. This serves as Henson Alternative's only theatrical film.

== Plot ==
In a world where living puppets coexist with humans but are treated as second-class citizens, Phil Phillips was the first puppet cop on the LAPD before being fired. Now a private investigator with a human secretary named Bubbles, he is hired by puppet client Sandra White to discover the identity of her blackmailer. Phil investigates a lead at a puppet-owned porn shop. While he checks their records in a back room, an attacker kills everyone else present including Mr. Bumblypants, a former cast member of the beloved sitcom The Happytime Gang.

The LAPD arrives and Phil meets with his former partner Detective Connie Edwards. Twelve years prior, Edwards was being held at gunpoint by a puppet perpetrator. Phil tried to shoot him, but missed and hit an innocent puppet, killing him in front of his young daughter. Edwards testified against Phil and a law was enacted preventing puppets from becoming police officers. In the present, Edwards believes it was a robbery gone wrong but Phil believes it was murder since no money was taken. That night, Phil's brother Larry, another former Happytime cast member, is torn apart when someone lets dogs onto his property. Afterwards, Phil reluctantly joins forces with Edwards to find the killer.

Suspecting someone is killing the Happytime Gang cast to receive a larger share of the royalty money when the show becomes syndicated, the two track down former Happytime cast-member Lyle in a puppet drug-den, where it is revealed that Phil saved Edwards by getting her an emergency puppet liver transplant. Lyle is killed in a drive-by shooting in front of Phil. After having sexual intercourse with Sandra and escaping the FBI, Phil goes to see Jenny, the only human Happytime cast-member and his former girlfriend, at a puppet strip club where she works. Phil is unable to protect her when her car explodes. The police see Phil leaving the scene and believe him to be responsible for the murders.

Phil hides at Edwards's apartment and they discover that former Happytime cast-member Goofer has apparently overdosed and drowned. They go to the house of the two remaining Happytime cast-members Ezra and Cara only to find their mangled bodies. The FBI arrives and detains Phil and Edwards. Phil is shown Sandra in an interrogation room. She reveals that she and Jenny are married and claims that Phil killed Jenny and the others to keep Sandra for himself.

Edwards is suspended from duty and enlists Bubbles for help exonerating Phil. They break into Sandra's home and discover a hidden room containing plans for the deaths of the Happytime Gang stars and a frameup of Phil. Edwards notices a picture of the puppet Phil accidentally shot years ago, and realizes that Sandra is the daughter of the man he accidentally shot and is seeking revenge against Phil. Bubbles triggers a booby trap, which ignites a fire destroying all the evidence. Afterwards, Edwards breaks Phil out of jail so they can stop Sandra.

Phil and Edwards race to the airport, where Sandra is planning to escape with the sitcom's royalty money. Phil apologizes for killing her father, saying it has haunted him all the years since and asks why the Happytime Gang stars had to die when the blame was his alone. Sandra says she wanted Phil to suffer as payback. It is revealed that Jenny is alive, having faked her death, and is in cahoots with Sandra. After Phil reveals Sandra's true history, Sandra knocks Jenny out to take the money for herself. Sandra holds Edwards at gunpoint, putting Edwards and Phil in the same position as twelve years before. Phil takes a shot, not missing this time, and killing Sandra.

Edwards's police superior Banning arrives to congratulate Phil and Edwards on solving the case. He restores Edwards to active duty and convinces the mayor to lift the ban on puppet cops, welcoming Phil back on the force. Phil asks Bubbles on a date, which she accepts.

== Cast ==
- Melissa McCarthy as Detective Connie Edwards, Phil's ex-partner.
- Maya Rudolph as Bubbles, Phil's optimistic, upbeat and kind secretary.
- Joel McHale as Special Agent Campbell, a stern and arrogant FBI agent.
- Elizabeth Banks as Jenny Peterson, a stripper and Phil's ex-girlfriend, who was the sole human member of The Happytime Gang.
- Leslie David Baker as Lt. Banning, Edwards's police superior.
- Michael McDonald as Ronovan Scargle, the CEO of the Puppet Television Network which produced The Happytime Gang.
- Cynthy Wu as Brittenie Marlowe, Larry Phillips's girlfriend.
- Mitch Silpa as Tommy, a criminal who sells puppet parts on the black market.
- Hemky Madera as Tito, a criminal who purchases puppet parts on the black market.
- Jimmy O. Yang as Officer Delancey, a police officer.
- Ryan Gaul as Officer Milligan, a police officer.
- Fortune Feimster as Robin, a weed dealer and a longtime fan of The Happytime Gang.
- Ben Falcone as Donny, an LAPD desk worker.
- Barry Rothbart as Fireman
- Damon Jones as the voice of the reluctant puppet doctor who operates on Edwards

=== Puppeteers ===
- Bill Barretta as:
  - Phil Phillips, a disgraced ex-cop who is now a private investigator. He was the first puppet to become a police officer, but was fired from the force after accidentally killing Sandra's father.
  - Junkyard, a member of Lyle's drug gang.
  - Boar, a common warthog who works on the beach boardwalk.
- Dorien Davies as Sandra White (née Jacoby), a puppet who hires Phil to investigate a case for her while having a secret vengeful motive against him.
- Kevin Clash as:
  - Lyle, an actor on The Happytime Gang who played a sports coach and is now a drug lord.
  - Augustus Bumblypants, a rabbit actor who played a mail carrier on The Happytime Gang and now has a pornography addiction.
- Drew Massey as:
  - Goofer, an actor on The Happytime Gang who played a handyman and is now homeless and addicted to sugar, which is like heroin to puppets.
  - Vinny, a vulture who works at the local porn shop.
- Ted Michaels as:
  - Ezra, an actor on The Happytime Gang and Cara's cousin.
  - A sexist thug that works for Lyle.
- Colleen Smith as:
  - Cara, an actress on The Happytime Gang and Ezra's cousin.
  - A Dalmatian dog at Vinny's porn shop.
  - Carol
- Alice Dinnean and Donna Kimball as Sheila and Diane (the "Rotten Cotton Girls"), a duo of puppet strippers.
  - Kimball also performs an unnamed cow at Vinny's porn shop.
  - Kimball also performs Roxy (puppetry, voiced by Patty Guggenheim)
- Brian Henson as a crab who lives in a trash can.
- Allan Trautman as:
  - An unnamed blue octopus at Vinny's porn shop.
  - The reluctant puppet doctor that operated on Edwards (puppetry only, voiced by Damon Jones).
- Victor Yerrid as:
  - Larry "Shenanigans" Phillips, Phil's older brother and an actor on The Happytime Gang who played a police officer, and who has since had his blue skin bleached and underwent a nose job.
  - An old man outside of Phil's private office, who loves singing and dancing.

In addition, Henson makes an on-screen cameo in a photograph in Edwards's apartment.

== Production ==
=== Development ===
Concept art depicting Phil, the grizzled central puppet character

Announced in 2008 as being in development at The Jim Henson Company, serving as the company's first film to receive an R rating from the Motion Picture Association of America, the film was picked up two years later by Lionsgate with a targeted January 2011 start date. At the time, Cameron Diaz had been offered a lead role in the film. Diaz dropped out and Katherine Heigl entered into talks to replace her.

In July 2015, it was announced that STX Entertainment had picked up the film rights to The Happytime Murders (Lionsgate having lost them) and put the film in active development, with script revisions by Erich and Jon Hoeber. In April 2016, Jamie Foxx entered negotiations to star in the film. In May 2017, it was revealed that Melissa McCarthy had signed on to star in the film instead, as well as to contribute minor, uncredited rewrites to the film's screenplay. This was followed by Maya Rudolph being added in August, and in September, Elizabeth Banks, puppeteer Bill Barretta and Joel McHale all officially joined the cast.

=== Filming ===
Principal photography on the film began in Los Angeles, California, on September 11, 2017. The film had a production budget in the range of $40–47 million, with McCarthy paid between $10 and 17.5 million.

There were a total of 125 puppets in the film with 40 created specifically for it. To accommodate the puppeteers, all of the sets were built up so that the puppeteers could stand on the floor, since their optimum way to operate the puppets is if they are standing with straight arms. Because the floor of the sets came up in pieces, the human actors had a two-foot (61 cm) margin to stay on their path. Visual effects supervisor Sam Nicholson said the film had many VFX challenges, specifying, "It's some of the most complex work that we've ever done because, in one shot you could have a combination of principal photography done at 8K and then puppets on greenscreen being puppeteered by four puppeteers for each puppet. So if you have, say, six puppets in a scene, you've got 24 puppeteers operating them, 15 voice actors voicing them and these are all people dressed in green suits. And then you have all the rod removal of those puppets, and then you have avatars or CG puppets that are standing right next to the real puppets."

== Release ==
The Happytime Murders was released to cinemas by STX Entertainment on August 24, 2018. The film was originally scheduled for August 17, 2018, but was pushed back a week.

The first official red-band trailer was released on May 18, 2018, with select screenings of Deadpool 2.

=== Home media ===
The Happytime Murders was released on Digital HD on November 20, 2018, and on DVD and Blu-ray on December 4, 2018, by Universal Pictures Home Entertainment.

== Reception ==
=== Box office ===
The Happytime Murders has grossed $20.7 million in the United States and Canada, and $6.8 million in other territories, for a worldwide total of $27.5 million, against a production budget of around $40 million.

In the United States and Canada, The Happytime Murders was released alongside A.X.L., and was projected to gross $13–15 million from 3,225 theaters in its opening weekend. The film grossed $950,000 from Thursday night previews, better than the $700,000 made by McCarthy's Life of the Party three months prior. It went on to debut to $9.5 million, marking the lowest opening of McCarthy's career as a lead. It fell 54% in its second weekend to $4.4 million, finishing eighth.

=== Critical response ===
On Rotten Tomatoes, the film has an approval rating of 23% based on 248 reviews, with an average rating of 4/10. The website's critical consensus reads, "The Happytime Murders wastes its intriguingly transgressive premise on a witless comedy that blindly pushes buttons instead of attempting to tell an entertaining story." On Metacritic, the film has a weighted average score of 27 out of 100, based on 48 critics, indicating "generally unfavorable reviews". Audiences polled by CinemaScore gave the film an average grade of "C−" on an A+ to F scale, the lowest of McCarthy's career as a lead, while PostTrak reported filmgoers gave it an "awful" 58% overall positive score.

Jess Fenton for Switch wrote:

I adored the concept, I loved the cast, the fact that this was directed by Jim Henson's son made me giddy, and yet... I did not like this movie. Hate is too strong a word, however I was deeply disappointed, underwhelmed, my sides were left unsplit.

Andrew Barker of Variety magazine wrote:

It should come as no surprise that Happytime comes up farcically short as a metaphor for racism. But its most fatal miscalculation is the decision to frontload so many of its crassest setpieces into the first 15 or 20 minutes, depriving the rest of the film of the shock value that is its entire raison d'etre.

The film received a positive review from William Bibbiani at IGN, who wrote:

The Happytime Murders may not be a timeless classic on par with Roger Rabbit, but it's more interesting and nuanced than its raunchy, violent humor suggests. The puppeteering is fantastic, the characters are interesting, and although the story isn't ingenious the jokes are usually funny.

Entertainment Weekly's Chris Nashawaty gave the film a C+, stating that "the cognitive dissonance of kiddie characters dropped into extremely adult situations should set off taboo sparks like they did in Team America: World Police ... but mostly it feels like a promising idea poorly executed." Peter Travers of Rolling Stone said "A few critics are calling it the worst movie of the year. Unfair! The Happytime Murders, the R-rated look at a serial killer running wild in a puppet-populated L.A., has what it takes to be a contender for worst of the decade."

=== Accolades ===
Award	Category	Recipient(s)	Result	Ref.
St. Louis Film Critics Association	Worst Film of the Year	The Happytime Murders	Nominated	
Houston Film Critics Society	Best Worst Film	The Happytime Murders	Won	
Alliance of Women Film Journalists	Hall of Shame	The Happytime Murders	Nominated	
Alliance of Women Film Journalists	Actress Most in Need of a New Agent	Melissa McCarthy	Nominated	
Golden Raspberry Awards	Worst Picture	Brian Henson, Jeffrey Hayes, Melissa McCarthy & Ben Falcone	Nominated	
Golden Raspberry Awards	Worst Director	Brian Henson	Nominated	
Golden Raspberry Awards	Worst Actress	Melissa McCarthy	Won	
Golden Raspberry Awards	Worst Supporting Actor	Joel McHale	Nominated	
Golden Raspberry Awards	Worst Screen Combo	Any two actors or puppets	Nominated	
Golden Raspberry Awards	Worst Screenplay	Todd Berger & Dee Austin Robertson	Nominated	

== Lawsuit ==
In May 2018, Sesame Workshop, the organization behind the production of the television series Sesame Street, filed a lawsuit against STX Productions for using their trademark in a film they have no involvement with, including the tagline "No Sesame. All Street". They alleged that associating a children's program with an adult comedy would smear the former's reputation as well as confuse individuals. In response, STX issued a statement indicating their persistence to keep the marketing for the film unchanged. On May 30, 2018, the lawsuit was rejected by the presiding judge for the case, with STX issuing a brief statement soon thereafter:

We fluffing love Sesame Street and we're obviously very pleased that the ruling reinforced what STX's intention was from the very beginning – to honor the heritage of The Jim Henson Company's previous award-winning creations while drawing a clear distinction between any Muppets or Sesame Street characters and the new world Brian Henson and team created. We believe we accomplished that with the very straightforward NO SESAME, ALL STREET tagline. We look forward to continued happytimes as we prepare to release Happytime Murders this summer.

Some subsequent television spots for the film made references to the lawsuit by starting the ads with "From the studio that was sued by Sesame Street..."

== See also ==
- Who Framed Roger Rabbit – 1988 live-action/animated film with a similar plot
- Meet the Feebles – a 1989 puppet musical black comedy
- Let My Puppets Come – a 1976 softcore pornographic comedy film using both human and puppet actors
