= Holmes & Watson =

2018 film by Etan Cohen

- Theatrical release poster
- Directed by: Etan Cohen
- Written by: Etan Cohen
- Based on: Sherlock Holmes and Dr. Watson by: Arthur Conan Doyle
- Produced by: Will Ferrell; Adam McKay; Jimmy Miller; Clayton Townsend
- Starring: Will Ferrell; John C. Reilly; Rebecca Hall; Rob Brydon; Kelly Macdonald; Steve Coogan; Ralph Fiennes
- Cinematography: Oliver Wood
- Edited by: Dean Zimmerman
- Music by: Mark Mothersbaugh
- Production companies: Columbia Pictures; Gary Sanchez Productions; Mosaic Media Group; Mimran Schur Pictures
- Distributed by: Sony Pictures Releasing
- Release date: December 25, 2018 (United States)
- Running time: 90 minutes
- Countries: United States; Canada
- Language: English
- Budget: $42 million
- Box office: $41.9 million

Holmes & Watson is a 2018 mystery comedy film written and directed by Etan Cohen. The film stars Will Ferrell and John C. Reilly as the eponymous characters Sherlock Holmes and Dr. Watson, respectively; with Rebecca Hall, Rob Brydon, Kelly Macdonald, Steve Coogan and Ralph Fiennes in supporting roles. The plot follows the famed detective duo as they set out to find the culprit behind a threat at Buckingham Palace.

First announced in 2008 with Sacha Baron Cohen as Holmes and Ferrell as Watson, Holmes & Watson languished in development hell for several years before Ferrell and Reilly were confirmed for their eventual roles in July 2016, and Etan Cohen was announced as director. Filming took place around London from late 2016 to early 2017. It is the third collaboration between Ferrell and Reilly after Talladega Nights: The Ballad of Ricky Bobby (2006), and Step Brothers (2008), and the first not to be directed by Adam McKay (who instead co-produced this film with Ferrell, Jimmy Miller and Clayton Townsend).

Holmes & Watson was released in the United States on December 25, 2018, by Sony Pictures Releasing, through its Columbia Pictures label. The film underperformed at the box office, grossing $41.9 million worldwide on a $42 million budget. The film received largely negative reviews from both critics and audiences alike for its script, humor, and unfaithfulness to the source material, and is widely considered as one of the worst movies of all time. The press reported numerous instances of people walking out early during screenings. The film received six nominations at the 39th Golden Raspberry Awards, and won four, including Worst Picture.

== Plot ==
Sherlock Holmes is viewed as a legendary detective. Both he and his partner, Dr. John Watson, are to view the trial of Professor James Moriarty, but are attacked by a swarm of bees, temporarily waylaid by a package sent by Moriarty and brought to them by their housekeeper, Mrs. Hudson. At the trial, Holmes reveals the man accused of Moriarty's crimes is an imposter named Jacob Musgrave, who is incapable of committing the murders due to tremors in his hand caused by excessive masturbation. Despite attempts by Inspector Lestrade to convince Holmes that his deduction is incorrect, Holmes is convinced that Moriarty is currently traveling to the United States while letting Musgrave take the fall for his crimes.

After the trial, the duo travel to Buckingham Palace to attend a surprise birthday party for Holmes, where they discover a corpse inside of a birthday cake along with a message from Moriarty, stating that Queen Victoria will die in 3 days' time. During the autopsy, Holmes and Watson meet Dr. Grace Hart and the feral Millie. Watson and Holmes become enamored with Grace and Millie, respectively. By the end of the autopsy, Watson declares that the corpse's cause of death is indeterminable, while Holmes believes that the person was poisoned. Furthermore, he believes that the poison came from Gustav Klinger. The pair eventually locate Klinger, who is indeed in league with Moriarty. Before Klinger can reveal anything, he is murdered.

Holmes decides that he must seek help from his brother Mycroft, who tells him that the murderer is someone close to him. Holmes mistakenly believes Watson to be the murderer and has him arrested. He comes to regret this decision, causing his emotions to return. Holmes goes to Watson's cell, only to find it empty save for a plate filled with red velvet cake crumbs. Deducing that his housekeeper made the cake and that Watson left the crumbs to send him a message, he tracks Watson and Mrs. Hudson, who is revealed to be Moriarty's daughter, to the Titanic, where the murder of the Queen is to take place. After apologizing to and freeing Watson, they rush to the main room where they discover a bomb, which Watson throws out of a window. The bomb lands in Mrs. Hudson's boat, killing her and her accomplices.

The pair are congratulated by the Queen, only for Holmes to defer the credit to Watson. The pair reconnect with Grace and Millie, the latter of whom reveals that her feral personality was an act to manipulate men. Each pair shares a kiss before Grace and Millie head out on the Titanic. After returning home, Holmes proudly displays a plaque on their building showing that Watson is a co-detective, finally giving him the recognition he desires (though it is still smaller than Holmes' own plaque). Later, Holmes and Watson confront Moriarty in a bar in the United States.

== Cast ==
- Will Ferrell as Sherlock Holmes
  - Hector Bateman-Harden as young Sherlock Holmes
- John C. Reilly as Dr. John Watson
  - Codie-Lei Eastick as young Dr. John Watson
- Rebecca Hall as Dr. Grace Hart
- Ralph Fiennes as Professor Moriarty / Jacob Musgrave
- Rob Brydon as Inspector Lestrade
- Kelly Macdonald as Rose Hudson
- Steve Coogan as Gustav Klinger
- Lauren Lapkus as Millie
- Pam Ferris as Queen Victoria
- Hugh Laurie as Mycroft Holmes
- Bella Ramsey as Flotsam
- Scarlet Grace as Pickle
- Noah Jupe as Doxy
- Braun Strowman as Brawn
- Billy Zane as himself, in an homage to his role in Titanic
- Bruce Buffer as himself
- Michael Buffer as himself

== Production ==
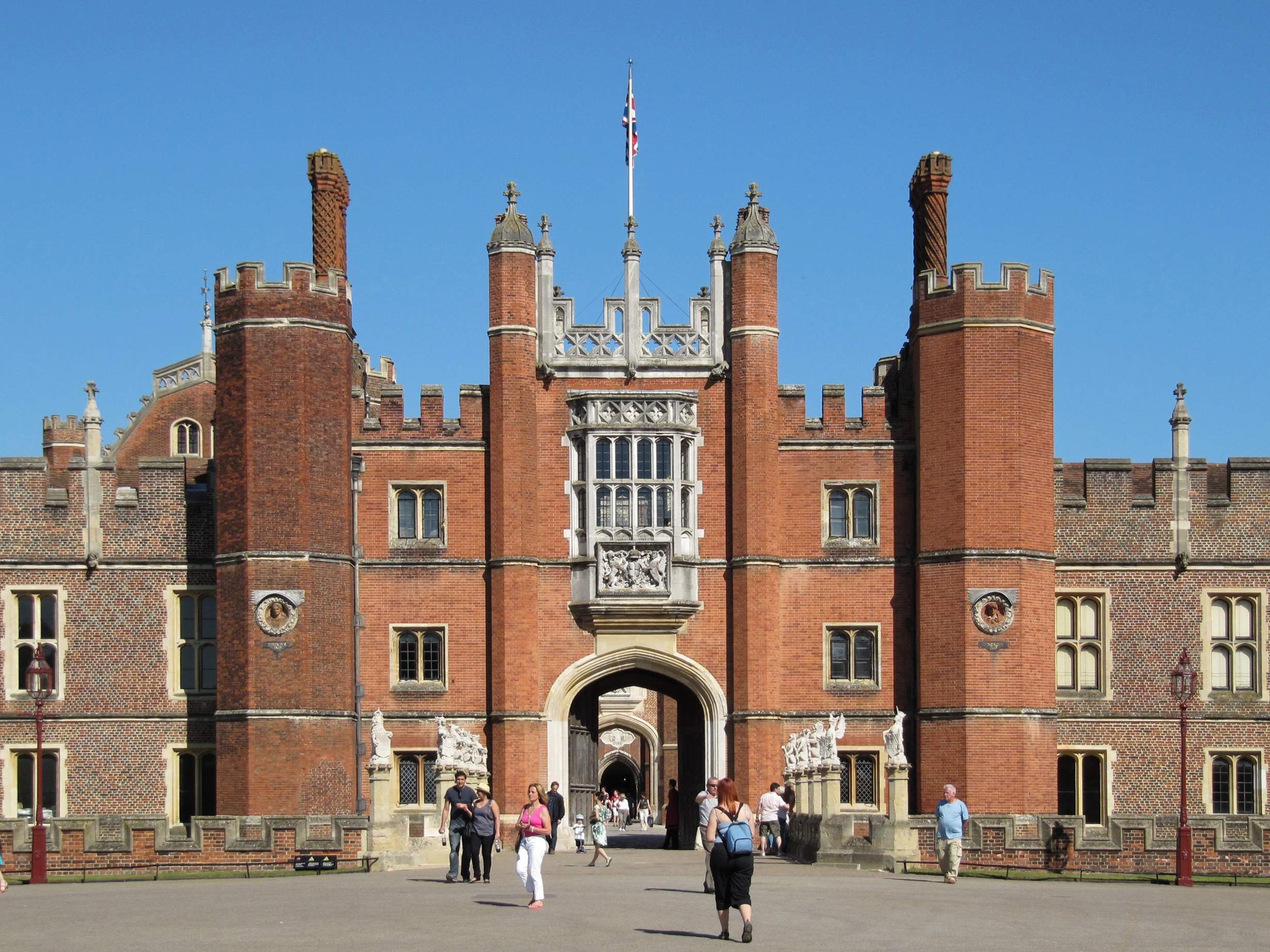
Hampton Court Palace, where portions of the movie were shot

In July 2008, it was reported that Sacha Baron Cohen would play Holmes and Will Ferrell would play Dr. Watson in a comedic take on Sherlock Holmes, to be produced by Judd Apatow with a script written by Etan Cohen, for Columbia Pictures.

On August 17, 2016, it was reported that Ferrell and John C. Reilly would star in the film, titled Holmes & Watson, and written and directed by Etan Cohen, with Ferrell playing Holmes and Reilly playing Watson. On November 14, 2016, Lauren Lapkus was cast to play Millie, with whom Sherlock is obsessed. On November 17, 2016, Rob Brydon, Kelly Macdonald, and Rebecca Hall were added to the cast. On January 6, 2017, Ralph Fiennes and Hugh Laurie also joined the cast. Filming began in early December 2016 in London at Shepperton Studios. In early February 2017, film crews were on location at Hampton Court Palace. A new song called "Strange Sensation" was written for the film by Alan Menken and his lyric-writer Glenn Slater, while the original score was composed by Mark Mothersbaugh.

== Release ==
Holmes & Watson was originally scheduled to be released on August 3, 2018, but in August 2017 it was pushed to November 9, 2018. It was pushed to December 21, 2018, and then finally to December 25, 2018. According to Deadline Hollywood, test scores for the film were so low that Sony, foreseeing a poor box-office reception, unsuccessfully attempted to sell its distribution rights to Netflix.

=== Box office ===
Holmes & Watson grossed $30.6 million in the United States and Canada and $11.4 million in other territories for a total worldwide gross of $41.9 million against a production budget of $42 million.

In the United States and Canada, the film was released alongside Vice and was projected to gross around $19 million over its first six days. It made $6.4 million on its first day and $3.5 million on its second. It went on to make $7.3 million in its first weekend for a six-day total of $19.7 million, finishing seventh. Publications reported numerous social media reports of audiences walking out of screenings early and The Verge argued that the film's critical and commercial failure illustrates a shift within the film industry away from broad comedy films with A-list stars. In its second weekend, the film dropped 54% to $3.4 million, finishing 10th.

== Reception ==
=== Critical response ===
Holmes & Watson was not screened in advance for critics, who subsequently panned the film. On the review aggregator website Rotten Tomatoes, 10% of 80 critics' reviews are positive, with an average rating of 3.2/10. The website's consensus reads: "The lowest and vilest alleys in London do not present a more dreadful record of the adventures of Sherlock Holmes and Dr. Watson than does Holmes and Watson." Metacritic, which uses a weighted average, assigned the film a score of 24 out of 100, based on 23 critics, indicating "generally unfavorable" reviews. Audiences polled by CinemaScore gave the film an average grade of "D+" on an A+ to F scale, and those at PostTrak gave it one out of five stars and a 30% "definite recommend".

Frank Scheck of The Hollywood Reporter called the film "a Christmas turkey" and wrote, "The overall shoddiness is typical of this feeble sendup that doesn't even manage to be as funny as the recent Benedict Cumberbatch and Robert Downey Jr. versions." Ben Kenigsberg of The New York Times found the film dull, writing: "More laughs are all that would have been necessary to prevent the stagnation of Holmes & Watson. As the movie stands, smuggling in booze to dispel the sense of dull routine could only help." Ignatiy Vishnevetsky of The A.V. Club called it "a failure on almost every level," further saying, "it's pervaded by an air of extreme laziness. It's cheap and tacky—a bizarrely dated parody of Ritchie's Holmes (complete with a soundalike score) poisoned with rib-elbowing topical references and puerile gags. It's the Sherlock Holmes movie with the red 'Make England Great Again' hat and the lactating Watson." Writing for Rolling Stone, David Fear called the film "so painfully unfunny we're not sure it can legally be called a comedy," and gave it 0.5/5 stars. Tony Libera, writing for City Pages, described the film as "not only bad, but one of the worst and unfunniest movies of 2018." He wrote that "Holmes & Watson is on another level of awful."

Graeme Tuckett of Stuff.co.nz gave the film two stars, stating that while it "has a handful of moments of genuine comic lunacy... all they really do is highlight the laziness and lack of laughs in the rest of the film." IndieWire reviewer David Ehrlich criticized the script and inability of the film to decide "what kind of dumb it wants to be", giving it a grade of C− and saying that it contained fewer laughs "than the deleted scenes of Step Brothers." David Edelstein of Vulture.com wrote "Holmes & Watson begins as ineptly as any comedy I've seen, and then settles into an agreeably silly groove that had the common hordes around me yukking it up." Jake Wilson of The Sydney Morning Herald was more positive, writing, "Holmes and Watson is not for everybody, but if you want to see Ferrell off the leash, this is the best opportunity in a long time."

=== Steve Coogan's response ===
Steve Coogan said at a screening of This Time with Alan Partridge in February 2019, "In 20 years' time, when all the dust has settled and people are able to look at that film objectively, they'll still think it's shit". He later poked fun at the film in October 2019 during a BAFTA Britannia Award ceremony. Standing on stage with John C. Reilly, Coogan gave a speech where he advised not to laugh while having an upset stomach, saying: "So best to avoid laughing. If you want to do that, I can recommend a film that John and I did called Holmes & Watson. You should be pretty safe with that."

=== Accolades ===
Award	Ceremony date	Categories	Recipients	Result	Ref.
Golden Raspberry Awards	February 23, 2019	Worst Picture	Will Ferrell, Adam McKay, Jimmy Miller, and Clayton Townsend	Won	
Golden Raspberry Awards	February 23, 2019	Worst Director	Etan Cohen	Won	
Golden Raspberry Awards	February 23, 2019	Worst Actor	Will Ferrell	Nominated	
Golden Raspberry Awards	February 23, 2019	Worst Supporting Actor	John C. Reilly	Won	
Golden Raspberry Awards	February 23, 2019	Worst Screen Combo	Will Ferrell and John C. Reilly	Nominated	
Golden Raspberry Awards	February 23, 2019	Worst Prequel, Remake, Rip-off or Sequel	Holmes & Watson	Won	

== See also ==
- List of 21st-century films considered the worst
