= Robin Hood (2018 film) =

Action film directed by Otto Bathurst

- Theatrical release poster
- Directed by: Otto Bathurst
- Screenplay by: Ben Chandler; David James Kelly
- Story by: Ben Chandler
- Produced by: Jennifer Davisson; Leonardo DiCaprio
- Starring: Taron Egerton; Jamie Foxx; Ben Mendelsohn; Eve Hewson; Jamie Dornan
- Cinematography: George Steel
- Edited by: Joe Hutshing; Chris Barwell
- Music by: Joseph Trapanese
- Production companies: Summit Entertainment; Appian Way Productions; Safehouse Pictures; Thunder Road Films
- Distributed by: Lionsgate
- Release date: November 21, 2018 (United States)
- Running time: 116 minutes
- Country: United States
- Language: English
- Budget: $100 million
- Box office: $86.5 million

Robin Hood is a 2018 American action-adventure film directed by Otto Bathurst and written by Ben Chandler and David James Kelly, from a story by Chandler. It is a modern retelling of the Robin Hood legend, and follows his training by John to steal from the Sheriff of Nottingham. The film stars Taron Egerton as Robin, and features Jamie Foxx, Ben Mendelsohn, Eve Hewson, Tim Minchin and Jamie Dornan in supporting roles. Returning home to England to learn the corrupt Sheriff of Nottingham (Mendelsohn) has seized his family estate, aristocrat Robin of Loxley joins forces with Friar Tuck (Minchin) and Little John (Foxx) – a fierce Arabian warrior who wants to put an end to the Crusades. Armed with arrows and dubbed Robin Hood, Loxley leads a band of oppressed rebels in a daring plan to rob the Sheriff of his money and take away his power.

The film was announced in February 2015, with Egerton signing on as the lead role that September. Hewson, Foxx and Mendelsohn all joined the cast over the following year, and principal photography began in February 2017, lasting through May.

Robin Hood was released by Lionsgate on November 21, 2018. The film received negative reviews from critics and grossed $86 million against a production budget of $100 million. Due to its label as a critical and financial flop, in addition to its modern take on classic source material, numerous publications compared the film to 2017's unsuccessful King Arthur: Legend of the Sword. Robin Hood was nominated for three Razzies for Worst Remake, Worst Supporting Actor for Foxx, and Worst Picture.

== Plot ==
Lord Robin of Loxley, an aristocrat and an English longbow master, lives in Nottingham and enjoys a good life with his lover Marian, before he is drafted by the corrupt Sheriff of Nottingham to fight in the Third Crusade against the Saracens.

Four years later, Robin becomes disillusioned with the Crusades when he fails to prevent his commander, Guy of Gisbourne, from executing unarmed prisoners, including a teenage boy, despite the pleading of the boy's father, which prompts Gisbourne to send Robin back home under accusations of treasonous conduct.

When he returns to Nottingham, Robin learns from his old friend Friar Tuck that the Sheriff had officially declared him dead two years prior, seizing his land and wealth to continue funding the war effort at the behest of the corrupt Cardinal Franklin. The citizens were exiled from the city and into the coal mine town across the river.

Investigating "the Slags", Robin witnesses the commoners planning to rise against the government that oppresses and exploits them and learns that Marian is now involved with their aspiring leader, Will Tillman. Robin is prevented from contacting her by the prisoner whose son he tried to save. The man then introduces himself as Yahya—which he says can be translated to "John"—and proposes that he and Robin work to end the war by stealing back the money taken from the people. Marian seeks Robin upon learning that he is alive, but John advises him not to tell her of his plans for her own protection.

Through a grueling training regimen in his now-decrepit manor, Robin improves his skills in archery and combat and begins stealing the riches that the Sheriff has extorted from the townspeople, earning the nickname "The Hood" while concealing his activities by masquerading as a frivolous playboy-Lord who supports the Sheriff's regime.

During a party in the Cardinal's honor attended by Robin, Marian, and Will, Marian and Robin discover the war is a ploy of the church, which is also funding the Saracen army, to defeat the king and claim total power after his death. Gisbourne and his men raid the Slags at the Sheriff's behest to find the Hood.

Marian attempts to intervene despite Will's objections and crosses paths with the Hood, whom she discovers is Robin, by recognizing his voice. John is captured by Gisbourne and tortured by the Sheriff but refuses to reveal the Hood's identity. When the Sheriff uses John's faith against him, he threatens him with the promise that his eyes and face will soon be the last he sees.

Robin reveals himself to the commoners at Marian's urging and is embraced as their leader, upsetting Will. Will leads a riot to distract the Sheriff's men while Robin intercepts a caravan transporting the Sheriff's fortune out of Nottingham, due to be delivered to the Saracen army. Robin then leads the townspeople in a battle against the Sheriff and his corrupt forces. During the confrontation, Robin shares a kiss with Marian, which Will witnesses moments before he is scarred by a Molotov cocktail. Angered by Marian's love for Robin, he leaves her and the revolution.

When the tide of the battle begins turning in the Sheriff's favor, Robin surrenders to avoid further bloodshed and is taken to the Sheriff's castle to be executed; one of the guards is actually John, who previously escaped his cell, and he claims revenge on the Sheriff by hanging him by the chain on a massive censer burner. Robin and John flee to reunite with Marian and the townspeople who assisted them, taking refuge as outlaws in Sherwood Forest, sharing their reclaimed loot.

Meanwhile, the Cardinal approaches a vengeful Will and offers him the chance to claim the power vacuum in Nottingham if he is loyal to the church. Will is appointed the new sheriff and brands Robin and his followers criminals. Robin defiantly challenges Will to come after him.

== Cast ==
- Taron Egerton as Robin of Loxley
- Jamie Foxx as Yahya / John
- Ben Mendelsohn as Sheriff of Nottingham
- Eve Hewson as Marian
- Paul Anderson as Guy of Gisborne
- Tim Minchin as Friar Tuck
- F. Murray Abraham as Cardinal
- Jamie Dornan as Will Tillman

== Production ==
The project was first announced on February 26, 2015, with a script written by Joby Harold, to be produced by Leonardo DiCaprio's Appian Way Productions; it became the third Robin Hood-based script in development, behind development deals previously announced at both Walt Disney Pictures and Sony Pictures. This script was expected to be taken by Sony to merge it with its other project. Lionsgate acquired the distribution rights to the film on March 19. It was then titled Robin Hood: Origins. On June 4, Lionsgate set Otto Bathurst to direct the film, which DiCaprio and Jennifer Davisson Killoran of Appian Way would produce along with Harold and Tory Tunnell of Safehouse Pictures.

=== Casting ===
On July 31, Deadline Hollywood revealed that several actors were circling for the lead role, including Taron Egerton, Jack Huston, Jack Reynor, and Dylan O'Brien. Basil Iwanyk would also produce the film through his Thunder Road Pictures.

Later on August 6, it was reported that Egerton was at the top of the list for the lead role and he was in early talks with the studio; however, it was predicted that he might not sign on to star in the film because of scheduling issues with the sequel to Kingsman: The Secret Service. On September 30, The Hollywood Reporter confirmed that Egerton had signed, with shooting to begin in February 2016, but that he was in conflict with the Kingsman sequel, which was scheduled to begin production in April. Later in mid-October, it was confirmed that the scheduling issues had been settled between both studios and that Lionsgate would now begin Robin Hood's production right after Egerton wrapped on Kingsman, likely at the end of summer 2016. On October 15, 2015, Eve Hewson was chosen for the role of Maid Marian.

On January 11, 2016, it was announced that Jamie Foxx had been cast to play the role of Little John, Robin Hood's right-hand man. On September 19, 2016, it was reported that Jamie Dornan had joined the cast to play Will Scarlet, half brother of Hood, member of Merry Men, and husband of Marian. In November 2016, the film's title was announced to be Robin Hood, with Paul Anderson cast for an unspecified role, which might be a darkly toned character. On December 13, it was reported that Ben Mendelsohn had been cast as the Sheriff of Nottingham and on February 14, 2017, it was announced that Tim Minchin had been cast as Friar Tuck.

=== Filming ===
Filming began on February 20, 2017, at different locations in Dubrovnik, Croatia, and in Le Raincy in eastern Paris, France, in the Église Notre-Dame du Raincy.

Further location shooting, along with principal studio filming, took place in Budapest, Hungary; when those facilities were lost in a fire, the remaining studio filming transferred to the Cité du Cinéma complex, north of Paris, France.

Filming concluded on May 19.

== Release ==
Robin Hood was released in the United States in standard theaters by Lionsgate's Summit Entertainment on November 21, 2018. The film was originally scheduled to be released on March 23, 2018, but in November 2016 was pushed back to the November date.

== Reception ==
=== Box office ===
Robin Hood grossed $30.8 million in the United States and Canada, and $54 million in other territories, for a total worldwide gross of $84.8 million, against a production budget of $100 million. Deadline Hollywood calculated the film lost the studio $83.7 million, when factoring together all expenses and revenues.

In the United States and Canada, Robin Hood was released alongside Creed II and Ralph Breaks the Internet, as well as the wide expansion of Green Book, and was projected to gross $13–15 million from 2,827 theaters in its five-day opening weekend. The film made $3.2 million on its first day, including $1.2 million from early previews ($800,000 from Tuesday night previews and an additional $400,000 from advanced Monday night screenings). It went on to debut to $9.1 million (a five-day total of $14.2 million), finishing seventh at the box office. With a production budget of around $100 million, Deadline Hollywood already listed the film as a box-office bomb, blaming the poor reviews and recycled property. In its second weekend the film made $4.7 million, dropping 48% and falling to eighth.

=== Critical response ===
On review aggregator Rotten Tomatoes, it holds an approval rating of 14% based on 166 reviews, with an average rating of 3.9/10. The website's critical consensus reads, "Robin Hood robs from rich source material, but is ultimately just another poor attempt to needlessly gussy up a classic tale with amped-up action and modern special effects." On Metacritic, the film has a weighted average score of 32 out of 100, based on 28 critics, indicating "generally unfavorable reviews". Audiences polled by CinemaScore gave the film an average grade of "B" on an A+ to F scale, while PostTrak reported filmgoers gave it a 75% positive score but a "low" 43% "definite recommend".

In his 1/4-star review, Rolling Stone's Peter Travers wrote: "Arriving just in time to win a place among the year's worst films, Robin Hood robs you of two hours", while Glenn Kenny of The New York Times said that the film "strains to be relevant ... Jamie Foxx must have lost a bet. The plot is twisty in a perfunctory way, the action predictably explosive, the sought-after exhilaration nonexistent." Peter Bradshaw of The Guardian summarized the film as a "beardless and bloated prequel (which) should be outlawed". Michael O'Sullivan, writing for The Washington Post, described the film as amounting to "a chilly and flavorless frappé of historical speculation, revisionist folklore and every lazy action-movie cliché ever written" and further characterized the dialogue and costumes as anachronistic.

=== Accolades ===
| Awards | Year | Category | Nominee | Result | Ref. |
|---|---|---|---|---|---|
| Alliance of Women Film Journalists | 2018 | Sequel or Remake That Shouldn't Have Been Made | Robin Hood | Nominated | |
| Golden Raspberry Awards | 2019 | Worst Picture | Jennifer Davisson, Leonardo DiCaprio | Nominated | |
| Golden Raspberry Awards | 2019 | Worst Prequel, Remake, Rip-off or Sequel | Robin Hood | Nominated | |
| Golden Raspberry Awards | 2019 | Worst Supporting Actor | Jamie Foxx | Nominated | |

== See also ==
- List of films and television series featuring Robin Hood
