= Order of Ikkos =

Medallion presented by United States Olympic and Paralympic medalists

- Awarded for: Recognition by U.S. Olympic and Paralympic medalists of an individual who contributed significantly to their success
- Country: United States
- Presented by: United States Olympic & Paralympic Committee
- First award: 2008

The Order of Ikkos is a medallion awarded by United States Olympic and Paralympic medalists to an individual who played a significant role in their success. The honor was established by the United States Olympic & Paralympic Committee prior to the 2008 Summer Olympics. Each U.S. Olympic or Paralympic medalist is provided one Order of Ikkos medallion, which they may present to a coach, mentor, teammate, family member, or other person whom they consider to have contributed meaningfully to their achievement.

== History ==
The Order of Ikkos was created by the United States Olympic Committee (now the United States Olympic & Paralympic Committee) in advance of the 2008 Beijing Olympic Games as a means for U.S. medalists to formally acknowledge one individual who contributed significantly to their athletic success. The medallion is separate from Olympic and Paralympic competition medals and is presented at the discretion of each athlete.

== Name ==
The award is named after Iccus of Taranto, an athlete and trainer from Tarentum in ancient Magna Graecia who is traditionally described in classical sources as an early pioneer of athletic training and diet; modern commentators sometimes call him a forerunner of systematic athletic dietetics. The name evokes the historical importance of coaching, preparation and mentorship in athletic achievement.

== Description and presentation ==
The Order of Ikkos medallion is produced for Games use and is typically presented with a ribbon or lanyard reflecting the design of the particular Olympic or Paralympic Games. The medallion is intended as a token of gratitude: each medalist receives a single medallion and may present it to any individual they choose. While coaches are frequent recipients, the award is not limited to coaches and has been presented to teammates, family members and other supporters.

Presentations often occur during Games-time ceremonies or related Team USA events, but athletes may also present the medallion later at public or private gatherings of their choosing.

== Notable recipients ==
- Donald J. Trump — On 12 March 2026, Kaillie Humphries presented her Order of Ikkos medallion to President Donald J. Trump at a White House event for Women's History Month. Humphries said: "Every Olympic medalist in the United States gets an Order of Ikkos that they get to hand to somebody in honor and recognition of somebody who's made a meaningful contribution to their journey to the podium, because Olympic medals are never achieved alone… I am here today, and I'm so honored to present this, my Order of Ikkos medal to you, Donald Trump."

== See also ==
- Olympic medal
- coach
- United States Olympic & Paralympic Committee
- United States Olympic & Paralympic Museum
