= Minimusical =

Short theatre piece with musical elements

Minimusical refers to works of musical theatre where elements of a musical, especially songs and dialogue, are incorporated into a short work for performance. Minimusicals are generally designed to be performed by children or teens in a classroom, camp or concert setting. They often last only about ten minutes in duration, but some are longer.

Minimusical productions are often used to introduce children to musical theatre performance, especially those who have no previous background or training in group drama, singing or dancing, live on stage. Some minimusicals are adaptations or use existing songs or melodies, while some are original.
