= 39th Golden Raspberry Awards =

Award ceremony presented by the Golden Raspberry Award Foundation in 2018

- Awarded for: Worst in film
- Date: February 23, 2019
- Site: Los Angeles, California

Highlights
- Worst Picture: Holmes & Watson
- Most awards: Holmes & Watson (4)
- Most nominations: Gotti, The Happytime Murders, Holmes & Watson (6)

The 39th Golden Raspberry Awards was an awards ceremony that identified the worst the film industry had to offer in 2018, according to votes from members of the Golden Raspberry Foundation. Razzies co-founder John J. B. Wilson has stated that the intent of the awards is "to be funny." The nominees were announced on January 21, 2019 and the winners were announced on February 23, 2019.

Regardless of its main winners and nominations, Spider-Man: Into the Spider-Verse became the first animated film to be nominated for the Razzie Redeemer Award. This would be the final time the Barry L. Bumstead Award was announced until the category was retired.

== Winners and nominees ==
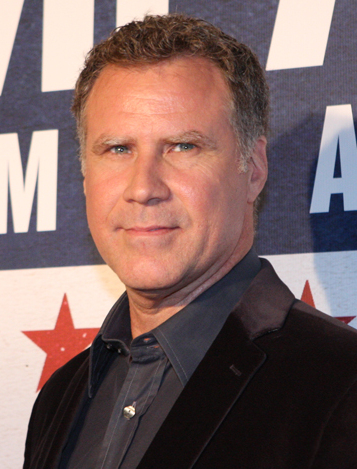
Will Ferrell, Worst Picture co-winner

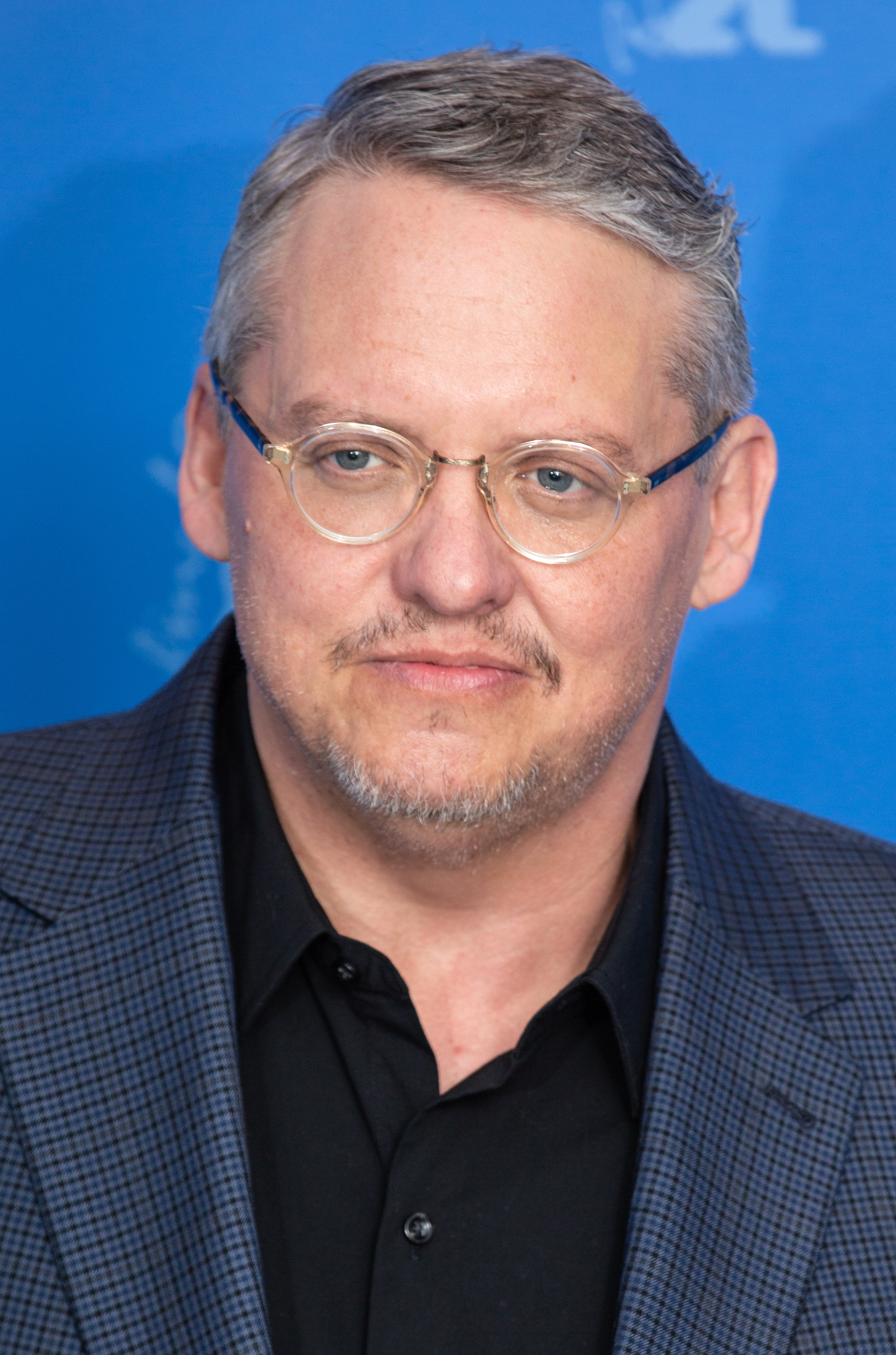
Adam McKay, Worst Picture co-winner

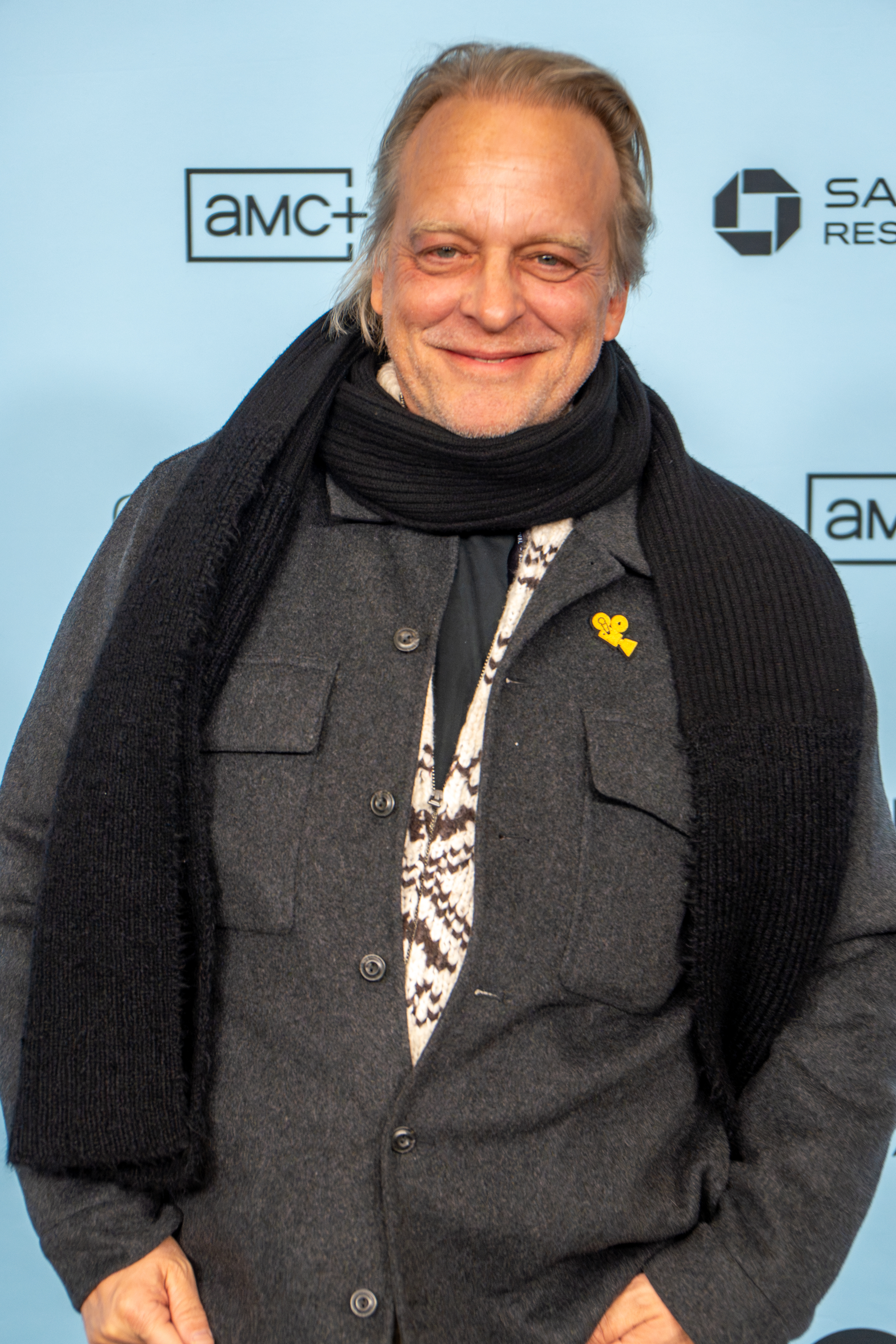
Clayton Townsend, Worst Picture co-winner

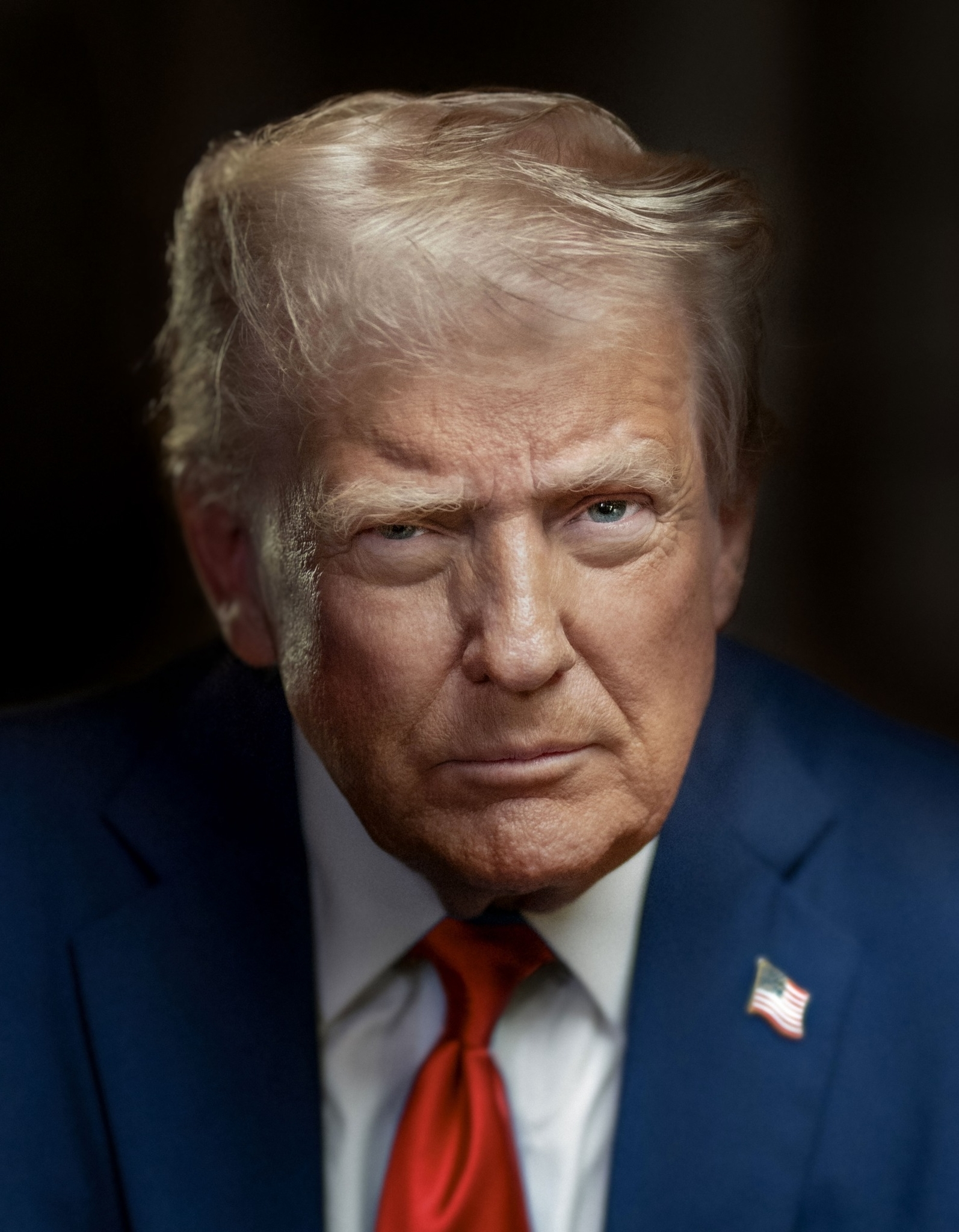
Donald Trump, Worst Actor and Worst Screen Combo winner

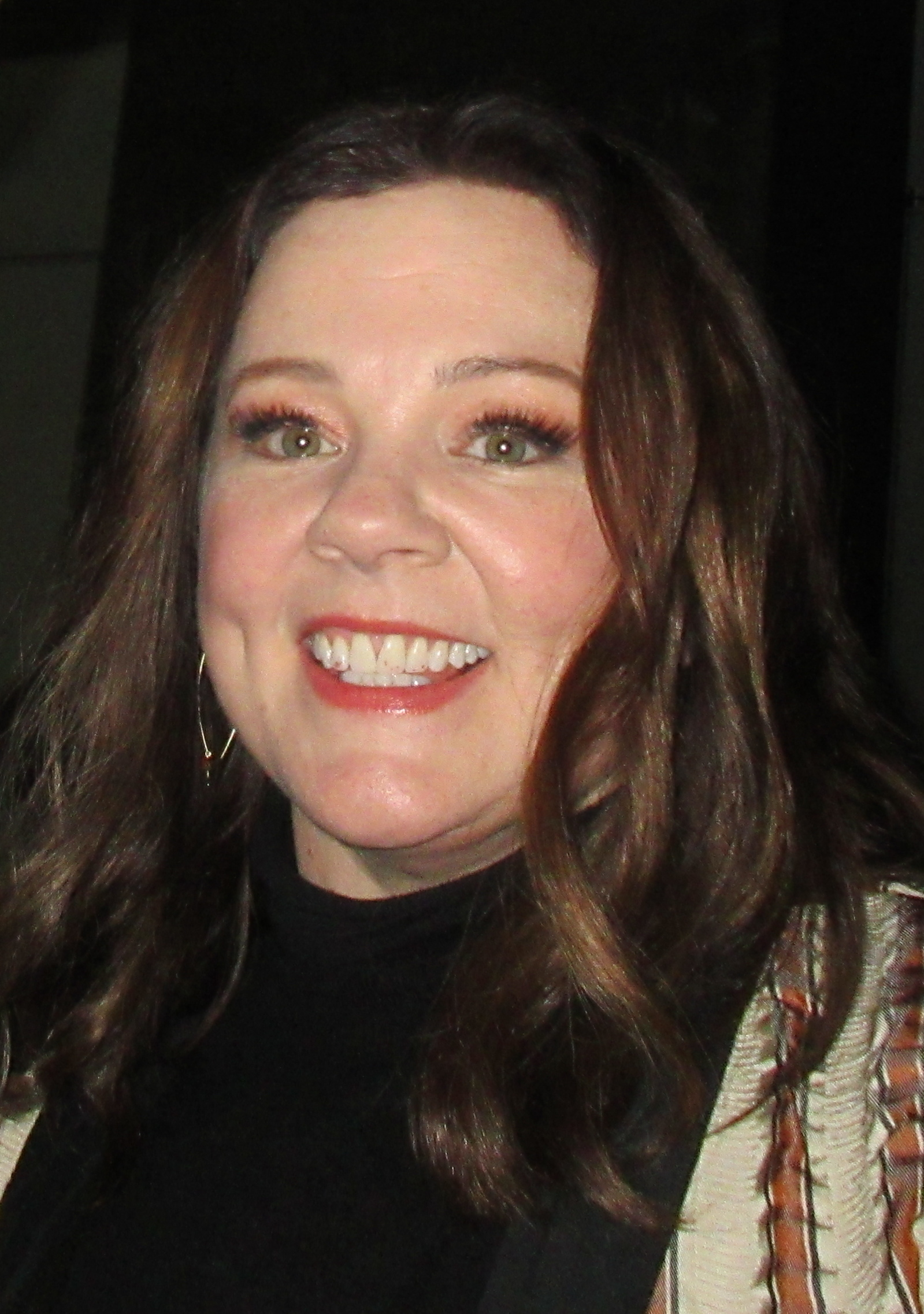
Melissa McCarthy, Worst Actress and Razzie Redeemer Award winner

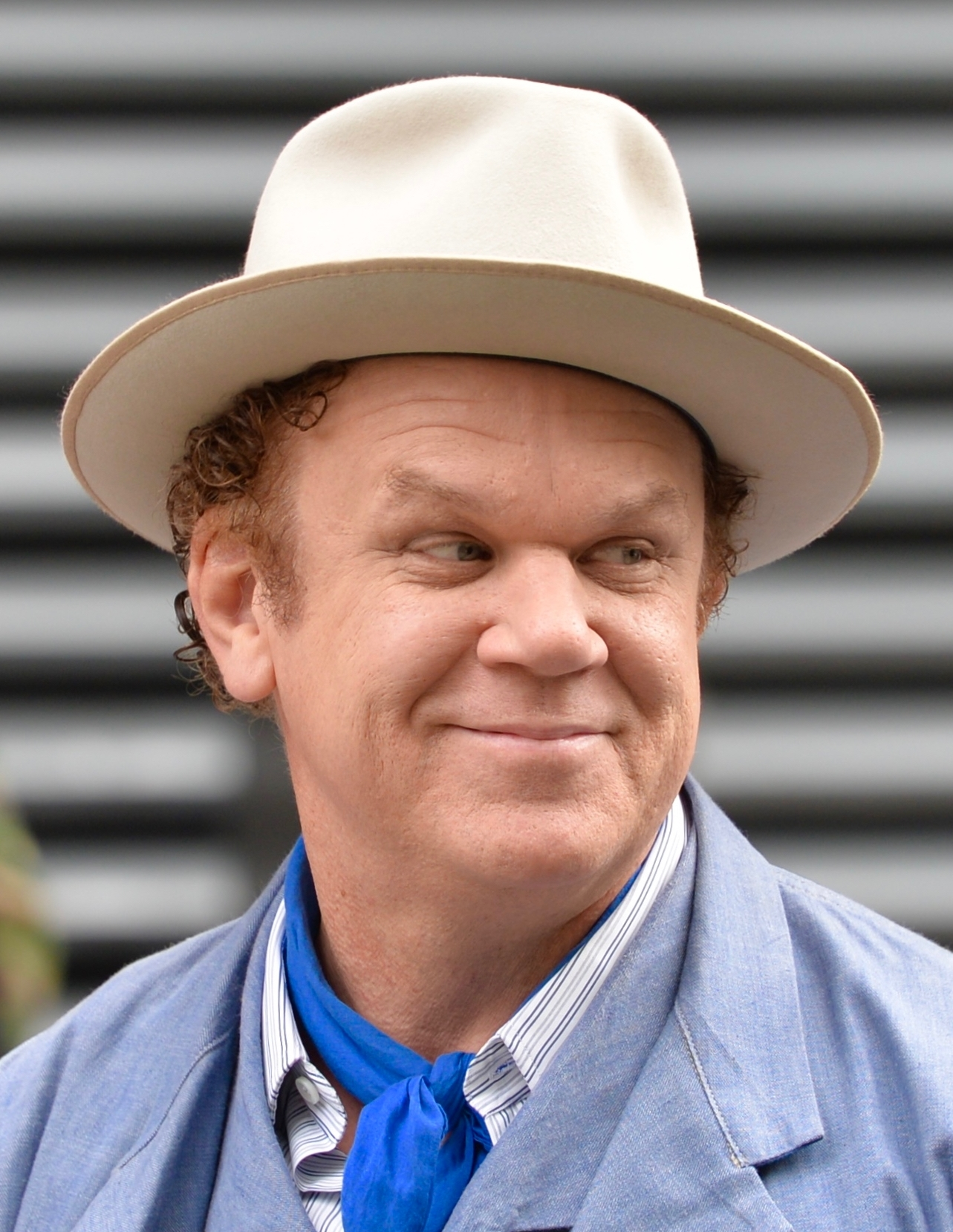
John C. Reilly, Worst Supporting Actor winner

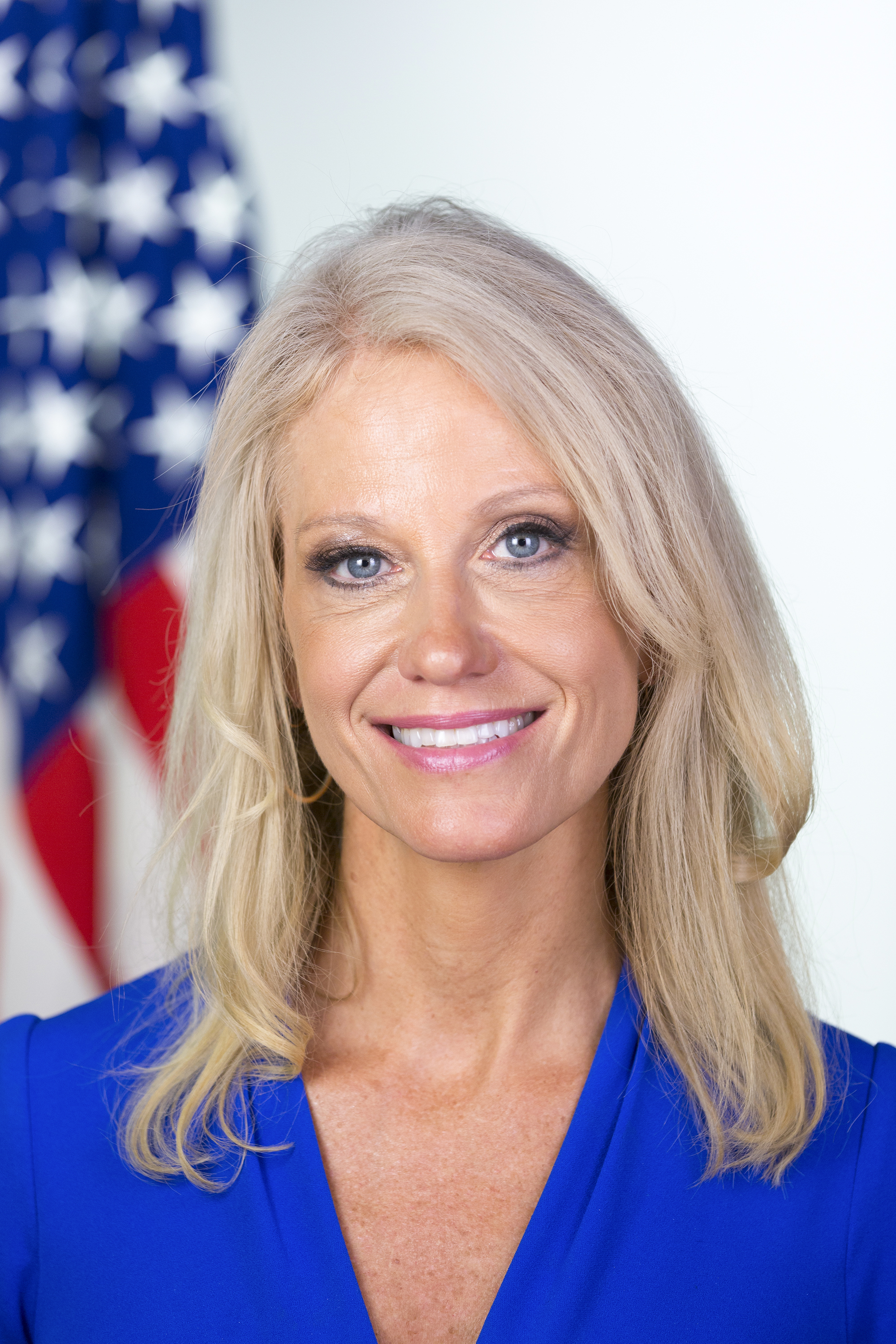
Kellyanne Conway, Worst Supporting Actress winner

Worst Picture: Holmes & Watson (Columbia) – Will Ferrell, Adam McKay, Jimmy Miller, Clayton Townsend; Gotti (Vertical Entertainment) – Randall Emmett, Marc Fiore, Michael Froch, George Furla; The Happytime Murders (STX) – Ben Falcone, Jeffrey Hayes, Brian Henson, Melissa McCarthy; Robin Hood (Summit) – Leonardo DiCaprio, Jennifer Davisson; Winchester (Lionsgate) – Tim McGahan, Brett Tomberlin	Worst Director: Etan Cohen – Holmes & Watson; Kevin Connolly – Gotti; James Foley – Fifty Shades Freed; Brian Henson – The Happytime Murders; The Spierig Brothers – Winchester
Worst Actor: Donald Trump – Death of a Nation and Fahrenheit 11/9 as himself; Johnny Depp (voice only) – Sherlock Gnomes as Sherlock Gnomes; Will Ferrell – Holmes & Watson as Sherlock Holmes; John Travolta – Gotti as John Gotti; Bruce Willis – Death Wish as Paul Kersey	Worst Actress: Melissa McCarthy – The Happytime Murders and Life of the Party as Detective Connie Edwards and Deanna Miles (respectively); Jennifer Garner – Peppermint as Riley North; Amber Heard – London Fields as Nicola Six; Helen Mirren – Winchester as Sarah Winchester; Amanda Seyfried – The Clapper as Judy
Worst Supporting Actor: John C. Reilly – Holmes & Watson as Dr. John Watson; Chris "Ludacris" Bridges (voice only) – Show Dogs as Max; Jamie Foxx – Robin Hood as Little John; Joel McHale – The Happytime Murders as Special Agent Campbell; Justice Smith – Jurassic World: Fallen Kingdom as Franklin Webb	Worst Supporting Actress: Kellyanne Conway – Fahrenheit 11/9 as herself; Marcia Gay Harden – Fifty Shades Freed as Grace Trevelyan Grey; Kelly Preston – Gotti as Victoria Gotti; Jaz Sinclair – Slender Man as Chloe; Melania Trump – Fahrenheit 11/9 as herself
Worst Screen Combo: Donald Trump & his self-perpetuating pettiness – Death of a Nation and Fahrenheit 11/9; Any two actors or puppets – The Happytime Murders; Johnny Depp & his fast-fading film career – Sherlock Gnomes; Will Ferrell & John C. Reilly – Holmes & Watson; Kelly Preston & John Travolta – Gotti	Worst Remake, Rip-off or Sequel: Holmes & Watson – (Columbia); Death of a Nation – (Quality Flix) (Remake of Hillary's America); Death Wish – (Metro-Goldwyn-Mayer); The Meg – (Warner Bros.) (Rip-off of Jaws); Robin Hood – (Summit)
Worst Screenplay: Fifty Shades Freed – Niall Leonard; based on the novel by E. L. James; Death of a Nation – Dinesh D'Souza and Bruce Schooley; based on The Big Lie and Death of a Nation by D'Souza; Gotti – Lem Dobbs and Leo Rossi; The Happytime Murders – Todd Berger; story by Berger and Dee Austin Robertson; Winchester – The Spierig Brothers and Tom Vaughan	Razzie Redeemer Award: Melissa McCarthy for Can You Ever Forgive Me?; Peter Farrelly for Green Book; Tyler Perry for Vice; Sony Pictures Animation for Spider-Man: Into the Spider-Verse; The Transformers franchise for Bumblebee
Barry L. Bumstead Award: Billionaire Boys Club

== Films with multiple wins and nominations ==
The following films received multiple nominations:

Nominations	Film
6	Gotti
6	The Happytime Murders
6	Holmes & Watson
4	Death of a Nation
4	Fahrenheit 11/9
4	Winchester
3	Fifty Shades Freed
3	Robin Hood
2	Death Wish
2	Sherlock Gnomes

The following films received multiple wins:

Wins	Film
4	Holmes & Watson
3	Fahrenheit 11/9
2	Death of a Nation

== Criticism ==
On January 31, 2019, the ceremony was accused of rigging the vote tallies for its nominees. For example, Jamie Dornan (Fifty Shades Freed) and Kevin Spacey (Billionaire Boys Club) received enough votes for Worst Actor, but neither were included on the final nominee list.

The ballot itself was also heavily criticized for overlooking critically panned films and the nomination and win of non-acting performances for documentary stock footage.

Despite mix-to-poor reviews, the awards was criticized for nominating The Meg in the Worst Remake, Rip-off or Sequel as a rip-off of Steven Spielberg's 1975 film Jaws despite having nothing to do with the film besides having a shark as an antagonist.

== See also ==
- 91st Academy Awards
- 76th Golden Globe Awards
- 72nd British Academy Film Awards
- 34th Independent Spirit Awards
- 25th Screen Actors Guild Awards
- 24th Critics' Choice Awards
- 45th Saturn Awards
