= Golden Raspberry Award for Worst Screen Combo =

Award for worst movie pairing or cast of the past year

- Awarded for: Worst in film
- Country: United States
- Presented by: Golden Raspberry Award Foundation
- First award: 1994
- Currently held by: All seven artificial dwarfs, Snow White (2025)
- Website: web.archive.org/web/20160413212505/http://www.razzies.com/

The Razzie Award for Worst Screen Combo is an award presented at the annual Golden Raspberry Awards to the worst film pairing or cast of the past year. The following is a list of nominees and recipients of the awards, along with the film(s) for which they were nominated.

== History ==
The category, which made its debut at the 15th Razzie ceremony, was originally named Worst Screen Couple, but in 2011 it was changed to Worst Screen Couple / Worst Screen Ensemble so entire casts could be included. This was changed again in 2012 where Screen Couple and Screen Ensemble were split and awarded separately before being changed again in 2013 to an individual award called Worst Screen Combo. The category is defined to include any combination of actors, actresses, props, or body parts.

== Worst Screen Couple 1994–2009 ==
- 1994 – Tom Cruise and Brad Pitt – Interview with the Vampire (tie)
- 1994 – Sylvester Stallone and Sharon Stone – The Specialist (tie)
  - Any combination of two people in the entire cast – Color of Night
  - Dan Aykroyd and Rosie O'Donnell – Exit to Eden
  - Kevin Costner and "any of his three wives" (Annabeth Gish, Joanna Going or Mare Winningham) – Wyatt Earp
- 1995 – Any combination of two people (or two body parts) – Showgirls
  - William Baldwin and Cindy Crawford – Fair Game
  - Tim Daly and Sean Young – Dr. Jekyll and Ms. Hyde
  - Dave Foley and Julia Sweeney – It's Pat
  - Demi Moore and either Robert Duvall or Gary Oldman – The Scarlet Letter
- 1996 – Demi Moore and Burt Reynolds – Striptease
  - Pamela Anderson's impressive enhancements – Barb Wire
  - Beavis and Butt-Head (voice of Mike Judge) – Beavis and Butt-Head Do America
  - Marlon Brando and that darn dwarf – The Island of Dr. Moreau
  - Matt LeBlanc and Ed the mechanical monkey – Ed
- 1997 – Dennis Rodman and Jean-Claude Van Damme – Double Team
  - Sandra Bullock and Jason Patric – Speed 2: Cruise Control
  - George Clooney and Chris O'Donnell – Batman & Robin
  - Steven Seagal and his guitar – Fire Down Below
  - Jon Voight and the animatronic anaconda – Anaconda
- 1998 – Leonardo DiCaprio and Leonardo DiCaprio (as twins) – The Man in the Iron Mask
  - Ben Affleck and Liv Tyler – Armageddon
  - Any combination of two characters, body parts or fashion accessories – Spice World
  - Any combination of two people playing themselves – An Alan Smithee Film: Burn Hollywood Burn
  - Ralph Fiennes and Uma Thurman – The Avengers
- 1999 – Kevin Kline and Will Smith – Wild Wild West
  - Pierce Brosnan and Denise Richards – The World Is Not Enough
  - Sean Connery and Catherine Zeta-Jones – Entrapment
  - Jake Lloyd and Natalie Portman – Star Wars: Episode I – The Phantom Menace
  - Lili Taylor and Catherine Zeta-Jones – The Haunting
- 2000 – John Travolta and anyone sharing the screen with him – Battlefield Earth
  - Any two actors – Book of Shadows: Blair Witch 2
  - Richard Gere and Winona Ryder – Autumn in New York
  - Madonna and either Benjamin Bratt or Rupert Everett – The Next Best Thing
  - Arnold Schwarzenegger (as the real Adam Gibson) and Arnold Schwarzenegger (as the clone of Adam Gibson) – The 6th Day
- 2001 – Tom Green and any animal he abuses – Freddy Got Fingered
  - Ben Affleck and either Kate Beckinsale or Josh Hartnett – Pearl Harbor
  - Mariah Carey's cleavage – Glitter
  - Burt Reynolds and Sylvester Stallone – Driven
  - Kurt Russell and either Kevin Costner or Courteney Cox – 3000 Miles to Graceland
- 2002 – Adriano Giannini and Madonna – Swept Away
  - Roberto Benigni and Nicoletta Braschi – Pinocchio
  - Hayden Christensen and Natalie Portman – Star Wars: Episode II – Attack of the Clones
  - Eddie Murphy and either Robert De Niro in Showtime, Owen Wilson in I Spy or himself cloned in The Adventures of Pluto Nash
  - Britney Spears and "whatever-his-name-was" (Anson Mount) in Crossroads
- 2003 – Ben Affleck and Jennifer Lopez – Gigli
  - Kelly Clarkson and Justin Guarini – From Justin to Kelly
  - Ashton Kutcher and either Brittany Murphy in Just Married or Tara Reid in My Boss's Daughter
  - Mike Myers and either Thing One or Thing Two – The Cat in the Hat
  - Eric Christian Olsen and Derek Richardson – Dumb and Dumberer: When Harry Met Lloyd
- 2004 – George W. Bush and either Condoleezza Rice or his pet goat – Fahrenheit 9/11
  - Ben Affleck and either Jennifer Lopez or Liv Tyler – Jersey Girl
  - Halle Berry and either Benjamin Bratt or Sharon Stone – Catwoman
  - Mary-Kate and Ashley Olsen – New York Minute
  - Shawn and Marlon Wayans (in or out of drag) – White Chicks
- 2005 – Will Ferrell and Nicole Kidman – Bewitched
  - Jamie Kennedy and anybody stuck sharing the screen with him – Son of the Mask
  - Jenny McCarthy and anyone dumb enough to befriend or date her – Dirty Love
  - Rob Schneider and his diapers – Deuce Bigalow: European Gigolo
  - Jessica Simpson and her Daisy Dukes – The Dukes of Hazzard
- 2006 – Shawn Wayans and either Kerry Washington or Marlon Wayans – Little Man
  - Tim Allen and Martin Short – The Santa Clause 3: The Escape Clause
  - Nicolas Cage and his bear suit – The Wicker Man
  - Hilary and Haylie Duff – Material Girls
  - Sharon Stone's lopsided breasts – Basic Instinct 2
- 2007 – Lindsay Lohan and Lindsay Lohan (as the yang to her own yin) – I Know Who Killed Me
  - Jessica Alba and either Hayden Christensen in Awake, Dane Cook in Good Luck Chuck or Ioan Gruffudd in Fantastic Four: Rise of the Silver Surfer
  - Any combination of two totally air-headed characters – Bratz
  - Eddie Murphy (Norbit) and either Eddie Murphy (Mr. Wong) or Eddie Murphy (Rasputia) – Norbit
  - Adam Sandler and either Kevin James or Jessica Biel – I Now Pronounce You Chuck and Larry
- 2008 – Paris Hilton and either Christine Lakin or Joel David Moore – The Hottie and the Nottie
  - Uwe Boll and "any actor, camera or screenplay"
  - Cameron Diaz and Ashton Kutcher – What Happens in Vegas
  - Larry the Cable Guy and Jenny McCarthy – Witless Protection
  - Eddie Murphy in Eddie Murphy – Meet Dave
- 2009 – Sandra Bullock and Bradley Cooper – All About Steve
  - Any two (or more) Jonas Brothers – Jonas Brothers: The 3D Concert Experience
  - Will Ferrell and any co-star, creature or "comic riff" – Land of the Lost
  - Shia LaBeouf and either Megan Fox or any Transformer – Transformers: Revenge of the Fallen
  - Kristen Stewart and either Taylor Lautner or Robert Pattinson – The Twilight Saga: New Moon

== Worst Screen Couple/Worst Screen Ensemble 2010 ==
- 2010 – The entire cast of Sex and the City 2
  - Jennifer Aniston and Gerard Butler – The Bounty Hunter
  - Josh Brolin's face and Megan Fox's accent – Jonah Hex
  - The entire cast of The Last Airbender
  - The entire cast of The Twilight Saga: Eclipse

== Worst Screen Couple 2011–2012 ==
- 2011 – Adam Sandler and either Katie Holmes, Al Pacino or Adam Sandler – Jack and Jill
  - Nicolas Cage and anyone sharing the screen with him – Drive Angry, Season of the Witch, Trespass
  - Shia LaBeouf and Rosie Huntington-Whiteley – Transformers: Dark of the Moon
  - Adam Sandler and either Jennifer Aniston or Brooklyn Decker – Just Go with It
  - Kristen Stewart and either Taylor Lautner or Robert Pattinson – The Twilight Saga: Breaking Dawn – Part 1
- 2012 – Mackenzie Foy and Taylor Lautner – The Twilight Saga: Breaking Dawn – Part 2
  - Any two cast members from Jersey Shore – The Three Stooges
  - Robert Pattinson and Kristen Stewart – The Twilight Saga: Breaking Dawn – Part 2
  - Tyler Perry and his drag get-up – Madea's Witness Protection
  - Adam Sandler and either Leighton Meester, Andy Samberg or Susan Sarandon – That's My Boy

== Worst Screen Ensemble 2011–2012 ==
- 2011 – The entire cast of Jack and Jill
  - The entire cast of Bucky Larson: Born to Be a Star
  - The entire cast of New Year's Eve
  - The entire cast of Transformers: Dark of the Moon
  - The entire cast of The Twilight Saga: Breaking Dawn – Part 1
- 2012 – The entire cast of The Twilight Saga: Breaking Dawn – Part 2
  - The entire cast of Battleship
  - The entire cast of Madea's Witness Protection
  - The entire cast of The Oogieloves in the Big Balloon Adventure
  - The entire cast of That's My Boy

== Worst Screen Combo 2013–present ==
- 2013 – Jaden Smith and Will Smith on planet nepotism – After Earth
  - The entire cast of Grown Ups 2
  - The entire cast of Movie 43
  - Lindsay Lohan and Charlie Sheen – Scary Movie 5
  - Tyler Perry and either Larry the Cable Guy or that worn out wig and dress – A Madea Christmas
- 2014 – Kirk Cameron and his ego – Saving Christmas
  - Any two robots, actors or robotic actors – Transformers: Age of Extinction
  - Cameron Diaz and Jason Segel – Sex Tape
  - Kellan Lutz and either his abs, his pecs, or his glutes – The Legend of Hercules
  - Seth MacFarlane and Charlize Theron – A Million Ways to Die in the West
- 2015 – Jamie Dornan and Dakota Johnson – Fifty Shades of Grey
  - All four "Fantastics" (Jamie Bell, Michael B. Jordan, Kate Mara and Miles Teller) – Fantastic Four
  - Johnny Depp and his glued-on mustache – Mortdecai
  - Kevin James and either his Segway or his glued-on mustache – Paul Blart: Mall Cop 2
  - Adam Sandler and any pair of his shoes – The Cobbler
- 2016 – Ben Affleck and his BFF (Baddest Foe Forever) Henry Cavill in Batman v Superman: Dawn of Justice
  - Any two Egyptian gods or mortals in Gods of Egypt
  - Johnny Depp and his vomitously vibrant costume in Alice Through the Looking Glass
  - The entire cast of once respected actors in Collateral Beauty
  - Tyler Perry and that same old worn out wig in Boo! A Madea Halloween
  - Ben Stiller and his BFF (Barely Funny Friend) Owen Wilson in Zoolander 2
- 2017 – Any two obnoxious Emojis in The Emoji Movie
  - Any combination of two characters, two sex toys or two sexual positions in Fifty Shades Darker
  - Any combination of two humans, two robots or two explosions in Transformers: The Last Knight
  - Johnny Depp and his worn-out drunk routine in Pirates of the Caribbean: Dead Men Tell No Tales
  - Tyler Perry and either the ratty old dress or worn-out wig in Boo 2! A Madea Halloween
- 2018 – Donald Trump and his self perpetuating pettiness in Death of a Nation and Fahrenheit 11/9
  - Any two actors or puppets in The Happytime Murders
  - Johnny Depp and his fast-fading film career in Sherlock Gnomes
  - Will Ferrell and John C. Reilly in Holmes & Watson
  - Kelly Preston and John Travolta in Gotti
- 2019 – Any two half-feline/half-human hairballs in Cats
  - Jason Derulo and his CGI-neutered "bulge" in Cats
  - Tyler Perry and Tyler Perry (or Tyler Perry) in A Madea Family Funeral
  - Sylvester Stallone and his impotent rage in Rambo: Last Blood
  - John Travolta and any screenplay he accepts
- 2020 – Rudy Giuliani and his pants zipper in Borat Subsequent Moviefilm
  - Robert Downey Jr. and his utterly unconvincing "Welsh" accent in Dolittle
  - Harrison Ford and that totally fake-looking CGI "dog" in The Call of the Wild
  - Lauren Lapkus and David Spade in The Wrong Missy
  - Adam Sandler and his grating simpleton voice in Hubie Halloween
- 2021 – LeBron James and any Warner cartoon character (or Time Warner product) he dribbles on in Space Jam: A New Legacy
  - Any klutzy cast member and any lamely lyricized (or choreographed) musical number in Diana the Musical
  - Jared Leto and either his 17-pound latex face, his geeky clothes or ridiculous accent in House of Gucci
  - Ben Platt and any other character who acts like Platt singing 24/7 is normal in Dear Evan Hansen
  - Tom and Jerry (aka Itchy & Scratchy) in Tom & Jerry: The Movie
- 2022 – Tom Hanks and his latex-laden face (and ludicrous accent) in Elvis
  - Both real-life characters (Marilyn Monroe and John F. Kennedy) in the fallacious White House bedroom scene in Blonde
  - Andrew Dominik and his issues with women in Blonde
  - Machine Gun Kelly and Mod Sun in Good Mourning
  - The two 365 Days sequels (365 Days: This Day and The Next 365 Days)
- 2023 – Pooh and Piglet as blood-thirsty slasher/killers(!) in Winnie-the-Pooh: Blood and Honey
  - Any two "merciless mercenaries" in Expend4bles
  - Any two money-grubbing investors who donated to the $400 million for remake rights to The Exorcist in The Exorcist: Believer
  - Ana de Armas and Chris Evans in Ghosted
  - Salma Hayek and Channing Tatum in Magic Mike's Last Dance
- 2024 – Joaquin Phoenix & Lady Gaga in Joker: Folie à Deux
  - Any two obnoxious characters (but especially Jack Black) in Borderlands
  - Any two unfunny "comedic" actors in Unfrosted
  - The entire cast of Megalopolis
  - Dennis Quaid and Penelope Ann Miller in Reagan
- 2025 – All seven artificial dwarfs in Snow White
  - James Corden and Rihanna in Smurfs
  - Ice Cube and His Zoom camera in War of the Worlds
  - Robert De Niro and Robert De Niro (as Frank & Vito) in The Alto Knights
  - The Weeknd and his colossal ego in Hurry Up Tomorrow

== Multiple wins ==
2 wins

- Ben Affleck
- Will Smith

== Multiple nominations ==
5 nominations

- Ben Affleck
- Adam Sandler

4 nominations

- Autobots
- Johnny Depp
- Tyler Perry

3 nominations

- Will Ferrell
- Larry the Cable Guy
- Kevin James
- Shia LaBeouf
- Eddie Murphy
- Sylvester Stallone
- Sharon Stone
- John Travolta

2 nominations

- Sandra Bullock
- Nicolas Cage
- Hayden Christensen
- Kevin Costner
- Robert De Niro
- Cameron Diaz
- Decepticons
- Megan Fox
- Salma Hayek
- Dakota Johnson
- Nicole Kidman
- Ashton Kutcher
- Taylor Lautner
- Lindsay Lohan
- Jennifer Lopez
- Jenny McCarthy
- Melissa McCarthy
- Demi Moore
- Robert Pattinson
- Natalie Portman
- Burt Reynolds
- Rihanna
- Kristen Stewart
- Will Smith
- Liv Tyler
- Jon Voight
- Shawn Wayans
- Marlon Wayans
- Mark Wahlberg
- Owen Wilson
- Catherine Zeta-Jones
