= Fahrenheit 11/9 =

2018 film directed by Michael Moore

- Theatrical release poster
- Directed by: Michael Moore
- Written by: Michael Moore
- Produced by: Michael Moore; Carl Deal; Meghan O'Hara
- Narrated by: Michael Moore
- Cinematography: Luke Geissbühler; Jayme Roy
- Edited by: Doug Abel; Pablo Proenza
- Production companies: Midwestern Films; Dog Eat Dog Films; State Run Films
- Distributed by: Briarcliff Entertainment
- Release dates: September 6, 2018 (TIFF); September 21, 2018 (United States)
- Running time: 120 minutes
- Country: United States
- Language: English
- Budget: $4–5 million
- Box office: $6.7 million

Fahrenheit 11/9 is a 2018 American documentary by filmmaker Michael Moore about the 2016 United States presidential election and first presidency of Donald Trump up to the time of the film's release. The film is a follow-up to Moore's Fahrenheit 9/11 (2004), a documentary about the presidency of George W. Bush. The film had its world premiere on September 6, 2018, at the 2018 Toronto International Film Festival, and was released in the United States on September 21, 2018, by Briarcliff Entertainment.

Despite grossing $6.7 million worldwide, one of the lowest totals of Moore's career, Fahrenheit 11/9 received generally positive reviews from critics. The film received a nomination for Best Documentary Screenplay from the Writers Guild of America. Three people depicted in the film (Donald and Melania Trump and Kellyanne Conway) collectively received four nominations at the 39th Golden Raspberry Awards and won three, including Worst Actor for Donald Trump.

== Synopsis ==
The distributor describes the documentary as "a provocative and comedic look at the times in which we live", referring to the 2016 United States presidential election. The documentary follows the unexpected loss of Hillary Clinton and the presidency of Donald Trump, and also explores two questions: how the U.S. progressed to the Trump presidency and how to "get out" of the era of the Trump administration.

The documentary begins by claiming that Trump's 2016 presidential campaign started out as a hoax merely to get more media coverage than Gwen Stefani, who was being paid more than Trump to appear on The Voice than he was on The Apprentice, but his racist remarks towards Mexicans and Chinese people and his belittling of America's current political policies on national television led NBC to cut their ties with him. Despite this, he had gained a large following of supporters, which prompted him to go ahead with his presidential campaign, after which NBC began covering him again. Moore also focuses on several other topics:

- Trump's media connections who helped him in his campaign, most of whom were men who, like Trump, had a history of being accused of sexual misconduct against women either before or after the 2016 presidential election.
- Highlights of Trump's own comments about women, particularly about his own daughter, Ivanka, about whom he stated on television more than once he would date her were she not his daughter.
- The Trump Organization's history of facing over 4,000 state and federal actions, particularly from African-American tenants who were unlawfully evicted from his apartments.
- Trump's support of the execution of the six alleged perpetrators of the 1989 rape of a female Central Park jogger even after their innocence had been proven and their convictions vacated in 2002.
- Trump's promotion of Birtherism, including him referring to then-President Barack Obama openly as a "village idiot from Kenya".

Apart from the Trump Administration, the documentary delves into some events that Moore believes are connected to or inspired by Trump, such as the 2014 Flint water crisis, which was orchestrated by an appointee of the then Republican Governor of Michigan Rick Snyder—who changed the source from Lake Huron to the Flint River, leading to toxic levels of lead in the water. Moore also focuses on the 2018 Stoneman Douglas High School shooting in Parkland, Florida, which resulted in the March for Our Lives protest across the United States calling for gun control measures, and also criticizes politicians who receive campaign donations from the National Rifle Association. Another of Moore's targets was outgoing U.S. President Barack Obama, whose visit to Flint in 2016, Moore says, did not live up to the expectations of the people of Flint, who expected to receive federal help after the visit.

Moore compares Trump's rise to power to that of Adolf Hitler and the Nazi Party, parallels the Reichstag fire with the September 11 attacks, compares Hitler's speeches blaming different ethnicities, religions, and sexual orientations for Germany's problems to some of Trump's comments, and showcases then-recent instances of unprovoked racial violence that he states were inspired by Trump.

In the conclusion of the film, Moore contends that the United States Constitution no longer protects normal Americans from the wealthy and powerful of American society, and that the American Dream is now nothing more than a mere dream. To this point, Moore cites his previous documentaries Roger and Me (which Trump stated in an interview with Roseanne Barr he enjoyed), Bowling for Columbine, and Capitalism: A Love Story. Moore says that after the likes of previous U.S. presidents such as Ronald Reagan, Bill Clinton, George W. Bush and Barack Obama, the country needed to see a president like Trump in order to wake up to the reality of what he believes the United States of America has truly become: a country not worth saving, but starting anew.

The documentary features cameos of left-wing activist politicians like Alexandria Ocasio-Cortez and Rashida Tlaib.

== Title ==
The film's title relies on U.S. date notation to refer to November 9, the date when Trump's presidential win in 2016 was announced (the election having taken place the day before). It serves as a callback to Moore's 2004 political documentary Fahrenheit 9/11, named for the date of the September 11 attacks in 2001. The titles of both documentaries are allusions to the 1953 dystopian novel Fahrenheit 451 by Ray Bradbury.

== Production ==
Director Michael Moore partnered with producers Harvey Weinstein and Bob Weinstein in May 2017 to produce and distribute Fahrenheit 11/9. The Weinsteins planned to fund $2 million out of $6 million in a documentary deal. The Weinsteins did not provide the funding, and the Harvey Weinstein sexual abuse allegations emerged in the following October. As a result, Moore laid off the crew and shut down development of the documentary. Before returning to Fahrenheit 11/9, Moore focused on putting on a Broadway show, The Terms of My Surrender, which ran for 12 weeks.

Production of the documentary eventually resumed with between $4 million and $5 million in private funding. As part of filming, Moore made a clandestine visit to the Florida resort Mar-a-Lago owned by Donald Trump and mingled at the resort for 15 minutes before being escorted out by security.

== Release ==
Fahrenheit 11/9 had its world premiere on September 6, 2018, at the 2018 Toronto International Film Festival. Moore also screened the documentary in his hometown of Flint, Michigan on September 10.

Briarcliff Entertainment initially considered releasing the documentary in July 2018. It used a theatrical release date optimization program and decided on September 21; Deadline Hollywood reported, "[It] will arguably be one of the only fresh wide choices out there for sophisticated adults, and will launch six weeks before the November 6 [US] mid-term elections."

Briarcliff released the documentary in 1,719 theaters in the United States and Canada on September 21, 2018, (the widest-ever for a Moore film), following the Nationwide "People’s Premiere" on September 19th, 2018, by GATHR’s Theatrical On Demand®. It was released alongside Life Itself, The House with a Clock in Its Walls, and Assassination Nation. Based on early tracking, Fahrenheit 11/9 was initially expected to gross $4–10 million in its opening weekend in the United States and Canada. Variety said the opening-weekend gross "won't come close to trumping" Fahrenheit 9/11, which grossed $23.9 million at 868 theaters in the United States and Canada. Audiences polled by CinemaScore gave the film an average grade of "A" on an A+ to F scale, while PostTrak reported filmgoers gave it an overall positive score of 82%, including an average 4.5 out of 5 stars. After making just $1.1 million on its first day, weekend projections were lowered to $3 million. The film went on to debut to just $3.1 million, finishing eighth with a per-theater average of $1,804. Deadline Hollywood noted the film should have begun a limited run in larger cities (such as New York, Los Angeles, San Francisco, San Diego and Chicago, where it ended up performing best) and built up positive word-of-mouth, instead of going wide to over 1,000 theaters in its opening weekend. It fell 63% in its second weekend to $1.1 million, finishing 12th. By the end of its theatrical run the film grossed $6.4 million domestically, one of the lowest totals of Moore's career, and the worst of any of his films that received a wide release.

Fahrenheit 11/9 was released on DVD and Blu-ray on December 18, 2018.

Four days before the 2024 election Moore released the movie on his YouTube channel for free viewing.

== Reception ==
=== Critical response ===
When Fahrenheit 11/9 premiered at the Toronto International Film Festival, The Hollywood Reporter said that the critical response was "positive overall". The Associated Press reported, "Film critics in Toronto largely hailed it as Moore's most vital film in years ... though others wondered if his Hitler rhetoric wasn't too extreme. More conservative reaction from outside the left-leaning movie world was, as expected, less enthusiastic." The review aggregator website Rotten Tomatoes reports an approval rating of 82% based on 186 reviews, with an average rating of 7.1/10. The site's critical consensus reads, "Fahrenheit 11/9 finds Michael Moore in fine fighting form, delivering a political call to action that ranks among his most effective works." On Metacritic, which assigns a weighted average rating to reviews, the film has a weighted average score of 69 out of 100, based on 46 critics, indicating "generally favorable" reviews.

Brian Tallerico of RogerEbert.com gave the film three out of four stars, saying that "Fahrenheit 11/9 is ultimately Moore's best film in years because its message is really simple and nonpartisan: get mad about something and do something about it" and added, "With a new issue being debated every day, is it any wonder that Fahrenheit 11/9 has an everything-and-the-kitchen-sink approach? After all, Moore argues, rather convincingly, that what matters is that we care about something." Tim Robey of The Telegraph gave the film two out of five stars, saying that "Much in Moore's analysis is very hard to disagree with, but this doesn't make it automatically valuable. Sharp points go astray, lost in the sloppy tirade."

Owen Gleiberman, reviewing for Variety, said Moore explored more issues than criticizing Trump, writing: "[Moore] makes the point that Donald Trump has always committed corruptions and outrages in plain sight. It's not that we don't see them; it's that he has a gift for getting people not to mind them" and that "Fahrenheit 11/9 would be better if it didn't romanticize the new wave of progressive action (which, incidentally, I believe in) as if it were the second coming. Yet the movie, in its way, summons something ominous and powerful. It's not a screed – it's a warning. It says, quite wisely: Take action now, or you may no longer have the opportunity to do so." The Hollywood Reporter's Deborah Young found that the documentary had "a pretty unfocused target" with going beyond Trump and said, "The multiple targets and multiple threads which weave in and out of Fahrenheit 11/9 make it feel jumpy at times and less focused than Moore's docs ... Nonetheless, there is much food for thought in the film, shot with the director's characteristic passion, flair, wicked sense of humor and willingness to push the envelope." In The Intercept Glenn Greenwald wrote, "what he’s trying is of unparalleled importance: not to take the cheap route of exclusively denouncing Trump but to take the more complicated, challenging, and productive route of understanding who and what created the climate in which Trump could thrive."

In The Wall Street Journal John Anderson wrote: "Almost the entire movie is lifted from other sources, and then edited in a way that makes his enemies (do they know they’re his enemies?) look as foolish as possible. ... Mr. Moore can’t help himself, he uses footage of Adolf Hitler lip-syncing a Trump speech. Much has been made of Mr. Trump’s questionable maturity. He has a kindred spirit in Michael Moore."

=== Accolades ===
Award	Ceremony date	Category	Subject	Result
Golden Raspberry Awards	February 23, 2019	Worst Actor	Donald Trump (also for Death of a Nation)	Won
Golden Raspberry Awards	February 23, 2019	Worst Supporting Actress	Kellyanne Conway	Won
Golden Raspberry Awards	February 23, 2019	Worst Supporting Actress	Melania Trump	Nominated
Golden Raspberry Awards	February 23, 2019	Worst Screen Combo	Donald Trump and "His Self Perpetuating Pettiness" (also for Death of a Nation)	Won
Writers Guild of America Awards	February 17, 2019	Best Documentary Screenplay	Michael Moore	Nominated
