= Death of a Nation (2018 film) =

Death of a Nation: Can We Save America a Second Time?
- Theatrical release poster
- Directed by: Dinesh D'Souza; Bruce Schooley
- Written by: Dinesh D'Souza; Bruce Schooley
- Based on: The Big Lie and Death of a Nation by Dinesh D'Souza
- Produced by: Gerald R. Molen
- Narrated by: Dinesh D'Souza
- Cinematography: Benjamin Huddleston
- Music by: Dennis McCarthy
- Production company: D'Souza Media
- Distributed by: Quality Flix
- Release date: August 3, 2018
- Running time: 109 minutes
- Country: United States
- Language: English
- Budget: $6 million
- Box office: $5.9 million

Death of a Nation: Can We Save America a Second Time? is a 2018 American political documentary film by Dinesh D'Souza, a US conservative provocateur. In the film, D'Souza presents a revisionist history comparing the political climate surrounding the 45th President of the United States Donald Trump to that of the 16th President, Abraham Lincoln. The film argues that the Democratic Party from both eras was critical of the presidents of the time and that the Democrats have similarities to fascist regimes, including the Nazi Party. The film was written and directed by Dinesh D'Souza and Bruce Schooley, and produced by Gerald R. Molen. It was produced on a budget of $6 million.

Death of a Nation was released in the United States on August 3, 2018, received universally negative reviews and grossed $5.9 million. Some film critics criticized the film as propaganda, and both critics and historians noted its falsehoods and misrepresentations. Owen Gleiberman of Variety said, "D'Souza's bogus conflation of liberalism and Nazism is really his way of denying the white-supremacist appeal that runs right down the middle of the Trump presidency." Several publications called the film one of the worst of 2018, and review aggregator Metacritic identified it as the worst-ranking film (out of almost 12,000 at the time) in the website's history. The film was nominated for four parody-style Golden Raspberry Awards, winning two.

== Synopsis ==
The documentary compares the 45th President of the United States Donald Trump to the 16th President of the United States Abraham Lincoln, and explores the role of the Democratic Party in opposing both presidents.

In the documentary, D'Souza explores the modern Democratic Party's use of racism, and attempts to demonstrate how Democrats have used accusations of racism, white supremacy, and fascism as a tool to discredit the political right. He said that the modern political left is currently using these types of accusations in attempts to remove Trump from office "by any means necessary." D'Souza also attempts to demonstrate a connection between the Democratic Party's past racism and advocacy for white supremacy and the current party, while saying that the Republican Party has not advocated such things.

In addition, D'Souza claims that fascism is a left-wing rather than a right-wing ideology, and that fascist regimes such as the Nazi Party have historically both praised the Democratic Party and used American racial law to inspire their own racial laws.

These statements are used to draw parallels between the modern political climate surrounding the election and presidency of Donald Trump with the historical events surrounding Abraham Lincoln's election, presidency, and assassination.

== Cast ==
The following figures appear in the documentary:

Interviews

- Dinesh D'Souza, conservative political commentator
- Robert Paxton, political scientist
- Allen C. Guelzo, Civil War historian
- Edwin Black, syndicated columnist and investigative journalist
- Stefan Kühl, sociology professor
- Richard B. Spencer, white supremacist
- James O'Keefe, conservative political activist

Re-enactment actors

- Victoria Chilap as Sophie Scholl
- Pavel Kříž as Adolf Hitler
- Rafael Pražák as Benito Mussolini
- Don Taylor as Abraham Lincoln

== Title ==
The title of the film is a reference to the 1915 film The Birth of a Nation, which portrayed the Ku Klux Klan as a heroic force. In Death of a Nation, D'Souza revisits a scene from his earlier documentary, Hillary's America, showing a reenactment of President Woodrow Wilson screening The Birth of a Nation in the White House. D'Souza said the film was a statement by Democrats at the time, and regarding the name of his documentary, that "ironically, my argument is that if you play out the logic of the progressive Democrats, ultimately they will kill America." The Arizona Republic's film critic Bill Goodykoontz recognized Death of a Nation as a play on The Birth of a Nation but questioned if making a connection to the "hugely influential yet horribly racist film" was appropriate.

== Production ==
The film is based on Dinesh D'Souza's books The Big Lie and Death of a Nation. D'Souza said the basis for his documentary were the books Hitler's American Model: The United States and the Making of Nazi Race Law by James Whitman, and Racism: A Short History by George M. Fredrickson. The film was produced on a budget of $6 million.

== Release ==
=== Theatrical run ===
Death of a Nation had its world premiere in Los Angeles, California on July 30, 2018. Figures in attendance included D'Souza, his wife and executive producer Debbie D'Souza, co-producer Aaron Brubaker, conservative political commentator Tomi Lahren, and political candidate Antonio Sabàto Jr. The political documentary premiered in Washington, D.C., on August 1, 2018, being co-hosted by D'Souza and President Donald Trump's son Donald Trump Jr. Also in attendance were United States Secretary of Housing and Urban Development Ben Carson, former sheriff David Clarke, reporter Lee Stranahan, alt-right internet troll and conspiracy theorist Jack Posobiec, and former Deputy Assistant to the President Sebastian Gorka.

Quality Flix, a subsidiary label of the Christian faith-based film production and distribution company Pure Flix, commercially released the documentary in 1,032 theaters in the United States on August 3, 2018. It was the first political documentary in a decade to be released at over a thousand theaters (the last documentary being Expelled: No Intelligence Allowed), with most documentaries usually being released in select theaters. Death of a Nation was released alongside Christopher Robin, The Spy Who Dumped Me, and The Darkest Minds, and was projected to gross around $3 million in its opening weekend. It grossed $2.3 million, which was the lowest opening of D'Souza's wide releases, and ranked 13th at the box office. Variety's Rebecca Rubin described the performance as a "mediocre debut" with a "tepid" average of $2,248 per theater. She said while a documentary grossing over a million dollars would be impressive, it was "not exactly promising" for a film released in over a thousand locations. It dropped 58.1% to $988K in its second weekend. When compared to D'Souza's previous films, The Guardian theorized that the film's diminishing box office returns can be attributed to the hypothesis that—similarly to trends seen with Michael Moore's left-leaning political films—"the success of a partisan political documentary is dependent upon the opposing party being in power during the time of its release." The film grossed a total of $5.9 million in its theatrical run.

PostTrak reported that filmgoers gave the film a score of 4 out of 5 stars, while The Hollywood Reporter wrote that those polled by CinemaScore (which was paid by Death of a Nation's filmmakers to conduct polls of audiences) gave it a grade of "A" on an A+ to F scale. Yahoo! News reported, "Exit polls show 57% men, 86% over 25, with 41% being over 55 and 69% Caucasian and 10% Hispanic." Variety's Rubin said the documentary "has generated some positive sentiment among conservatives" such as The Daily Caller journalist Stephanie Hamill.

There were dozens of Republican Party watch parties of Death of a Nation across the United States. The New York Times reported the moviegoers' takeaway after one such screening, "It was a confirmation of a worldview they feel is often unjustly ridiculed or intentionally ignored. They said it spoke to their deep-seated fears about the fate of the country if Democrats prevail in the November midterms, and did so using the raw, flame-throwing rhetoric that, to them, signals a Trump-like authority and authenticity."

=== Home media ===
Quality Flix and Universal Pictures Home Entertainment released Death of a Nation on home media. It was released on digital HD on October 16, 2018 and on DVD and Blu-ray on October 30, 2018. The Texas Patriots PAC mailed discs to undecided voters ahead of the United States midterm elections on November 6, 2018.

== Reception ==
=== Film critics ===
Critics panned the documentary. Haaretz's Adrian Hennigan said they were "unmoved by D'Souza's claims for authenticity". Hennigan said, "Some critics questioned whether they should be giving any space to the filmmaker's right-wing guff in praise of Trump and off-the-screen rants against liberals." The film was sharply criticized for drawing parallels between Democratic Party and Nazi Party ideologies. On the review aggregation website Rotten Tomatoes, the film holds a critical approval rating of 0% based on 12 reviews, with an average rating of 2.8/10. On Metacritic, the film has a weighted average score of 1 out of 100, based on eight reviews, indicating "overwhelming dislike". At the end of 2018, the publications The A.V. Club, Variety, Chicago Tribune, and The Playlist listed Death of a Nation among the worst films of the year. Metacritic ranked the film as the worst of 2018.

Peter Sobczynski of RogerEbert.com described Death of a Nation as "shabbily constructed and artistically bankrupt ... D'Souza's usual stew of cherry-picked facts, overt omissions, inept historical reenactments, slanders, innuendos, stuff taken from his earlier movies, shots of him walking pensively through empty areas and clips from other and better movies". He added that the documentary "could well be of service to future historians struggling to make sense of our current madness". Owen Gleiberman, reviewing for Variety, said, "Dinesh D'Souza goes over the top—of hate, and of truth—in his latest documentary, a radical-right screed that equates liberalism with Nazism." Gleiberman compared the film to D'Souza's previous documentaries, stating: "Death of a Nation breaks through to a whole new slime-o-sphere of over-the-top ideological libel." Vadim Rizov of The A.V. Club gave the film a grade of F, writing: "D'Souza fails, as ever, to make an argument that would resonate outside the QAnon echo chamber." Adam Graham of The Detroit News gave the film a grade of D−, writing: "D'Souza quotes Hitler (played by Pavel Kríz) in one scene as saying, "if you tell a big enough lie and tell it frequently enough, it will be believed." It's a concept D'Souza has taken to heart."

The Hollywood Reporter's Frank Scheck called the documentary "painfully unendurable" and that D'Souza's new film was more "hyperbolic and hysterical" than his past films, particularly with the claim that "Democrats... are merely fascists and Nazis, minus the cool iconography". Scheck also found the film to have "many poorly staged, cheesy historical reenactments featuring actors who wouldn't pass muster at a small-town dinner theater". The critic concluded, "For all of its incendiary arguments, Death of a Nation is ultimately tedious and repetitive." Bill Goodykoontz, reviewing for The Arizona Republic, described the documentary as "messy, unintentionally hilarious". Goodykoontz said he gave D'Souza's 2016: Obama's America "a somewhat positive review" based on craft and despite "live-action recreations that are laughably inept" and a lack of narrative flow. He said, "D'Souza does some of what he did in Hillary's America, taking established facts... and pretending like they are some sort of secret that he alone has uncovered. He addresses some of the counterarguments to his positions... But he's not putting his claims together in any form that makes sense."

D'Souza blamed the negative critical reception and the resulting Rotten Tomatoes score on critics being leftist and suppressing his message with negative reviews.

=== Golden Raspberry Awards ===
Death of a Nation was nominated for four Golden Raspberry Awards—annual parody awards also known as the "Razzies"—and won two. President Donald Trump won for Worst Actor based on clips of him appearing in Death of a Nation and Michael Moore's Fahrenheit 11/9. Trump and "His Self Perpetuating Pettiness" also won for Worst Screen Combo in both documentaries. Death of a Nation was nominated for Worst Remake, Rip-off or Sequel, being connected with D'Souza's previous film Hillary's America. Death of a Nation was also nominated for Worst Screenplay.

== Historical accuracy ==
In addition to film critics, historians criticized the film for its falsehoods and misrepresentations. Historian Adam Tooze said of the film's premise that the contemporary US Democratic Party's policies matched the Nazi Party's policies is false. The Independent reported, "[Tooze] said it was commonplace for conservatives to try and smear progressives by saying the Nazis also had a welfare programme... almost all political parties in Europe in the 1920s supported some sort of welfare scheme. The difference, he said, was that the Nazis were bent on launching 'all out war'." Historian Robert Paxton, who appears in the documentary, said he was interviewed under false pretenses and had his confirmation of Mussolini and Hitler's welfare programs shared without context. Mic reported, "[Paxton] forcefully pushed against the idea that fascism is a feature of progressive ideology, explaining that while fascists of the 20th Century often used leftist rhetoric and appeals, they went on to betray those principles in favor of corporatism and conservative elite." Paxton found "D'Souza's conclusions to be a distortion of history".

Historian John Broich, associate professor at Case Western, said the film's premise of connecting liberalism with fascism is a category error, "a fallacy in which one compares or conflates things that actually belong in different categories". Broich continued, "Fascism and leftism belong in fundamentally different categories, because the essence of fascism was, and is, anti-leftism... While historians certainly debate the details, they all agree with this basic precept about the core of fascism." Broich quoted Paxton, who specializes in fascism, "[Fascism is] dictatorship against the Left amidst popular enthusiasm."

Historian Kevin M. Kruse of Princeton University debunked one of the film's central arguments—that Southern Democrats who were against African Americans' civil rights did not defect from the Democratic Party when it began supporting such civil rights—saying that many voters, but only some politicians, defected.

== See also ==
- Fascism and ideology
- History of the United States Democratic Party
- History of the United States Republican Party
- Historian's fallacy
- Political spectrum
- Southern strategy
