= 37th Golden Raspberry Awards =

Award ceremony presented by the Golden Raspberry Award Foundation in 2016

- Awarded for: Worst in film
- Date: February 25, 2017
- Site: Los Angeles, California

Highlights
- Worst Picture: Hillary's America: The Secret History of the Democratic Party
- Most awards: Batman v Superman: Dawn of Justice / Hillary's America: The Secret History of the Democratic Party (4)
- Most nominations: Batman v Superman: Dawn of Justice / Zoolander 2 (8)

The 37th Golden Raspberry Awards, or Razzies, was a parodic awards ceremony that identified the worst the film industry had to offer in 2016, according to votes from members of the Golden Raspberry Foundation. Razzies co-founder John J. B. Wilson has stated that the intent of the awards is "to be funny." The pre-nomination ballots were revealed on the week of January 2, 2017, with the nominations being revealed on January 23, 2017. The winners were announced on February 25, 2017.

Hillary's America: The Secret History of the Democratic Party became the first documentary film to be awarded Worst Picture, also winning Worst Director, Worst Actor, and Worst Actress; Batman v Superman: Dawn of Justice also won four awards, including Worst Remake, Rip-off or Sequel and Worst Screenplay. Misconduct and Zoolander 2 won one award each, while Mel Gibson was awarded the Razzie Redeemer Award for directing Hacksaw Ridge.

== Winners and nominees ==
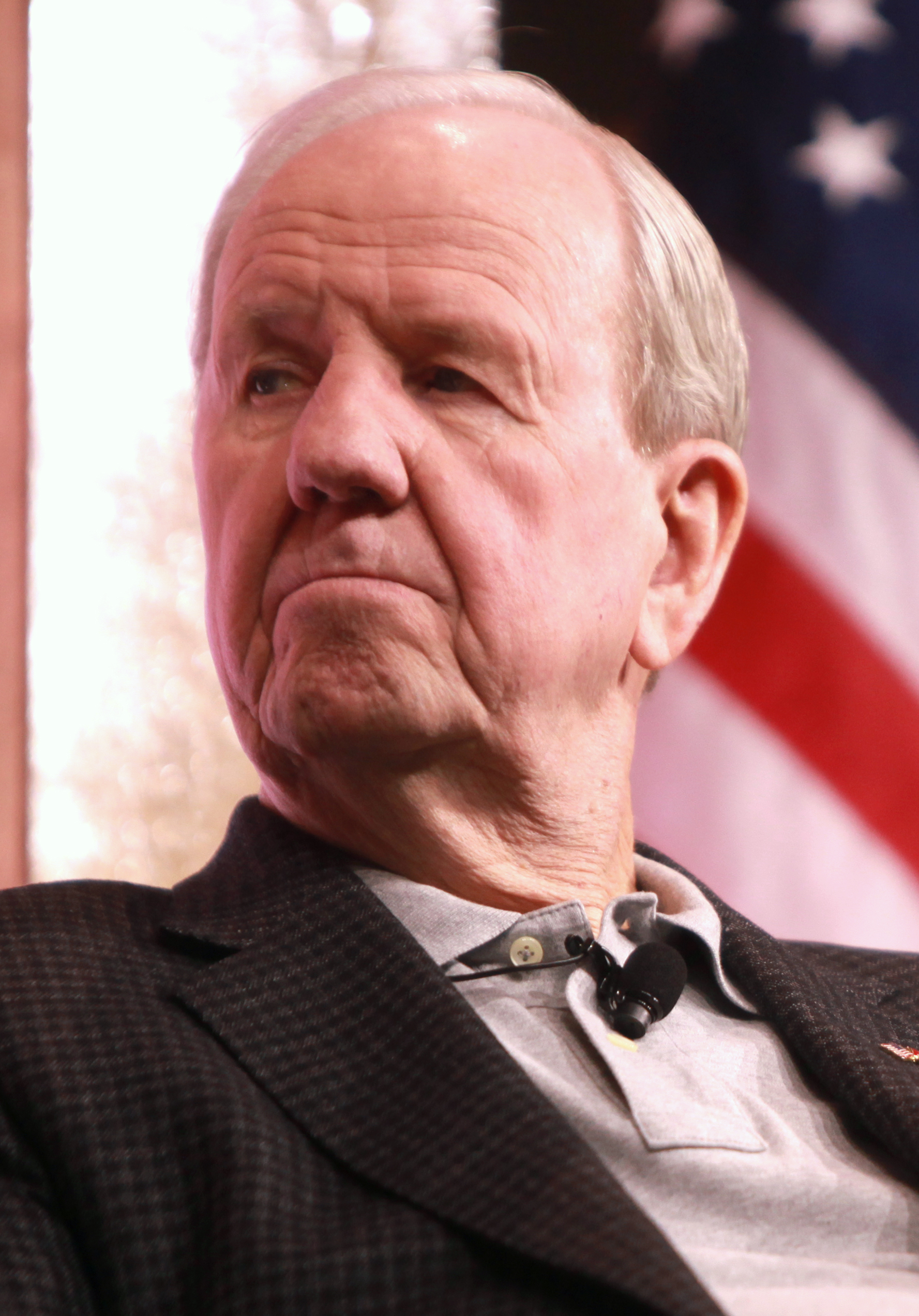
Gerald R. Molen, Worst Picture winner

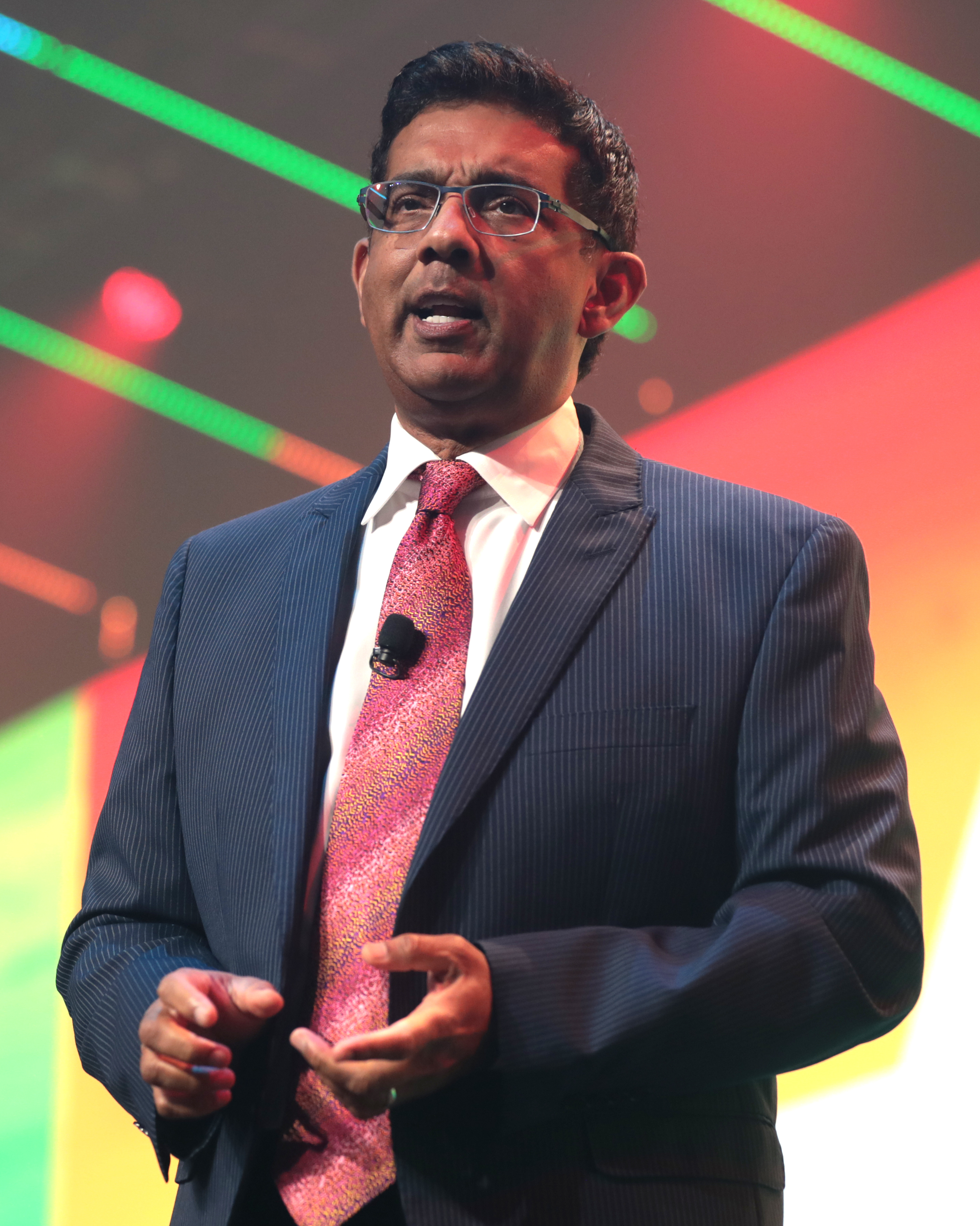
Dinesh D'Souza, Worst Director co-winner and Worst Actor winner

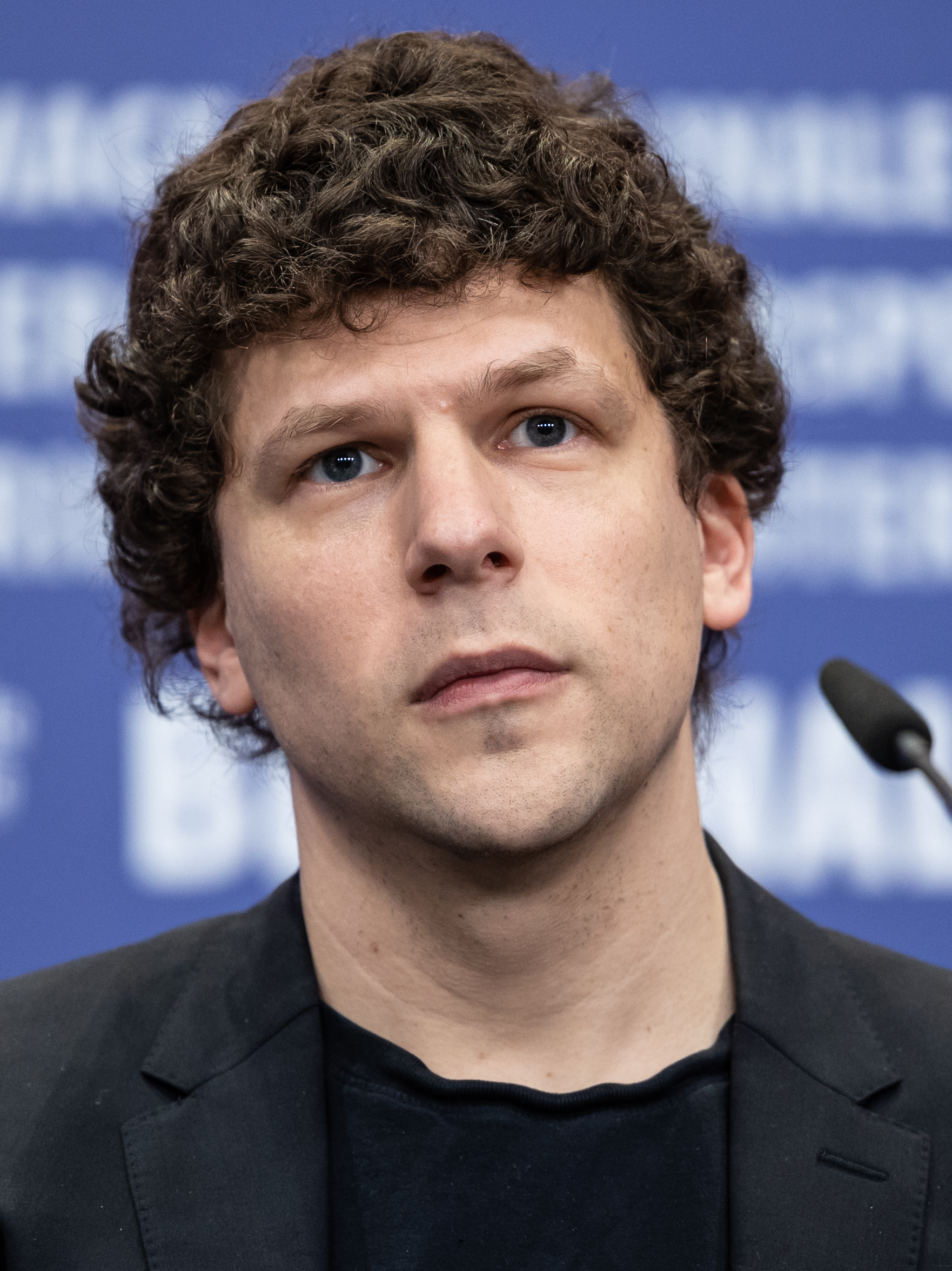
Jesse Eisenberg, Worst Supporting Actor winner

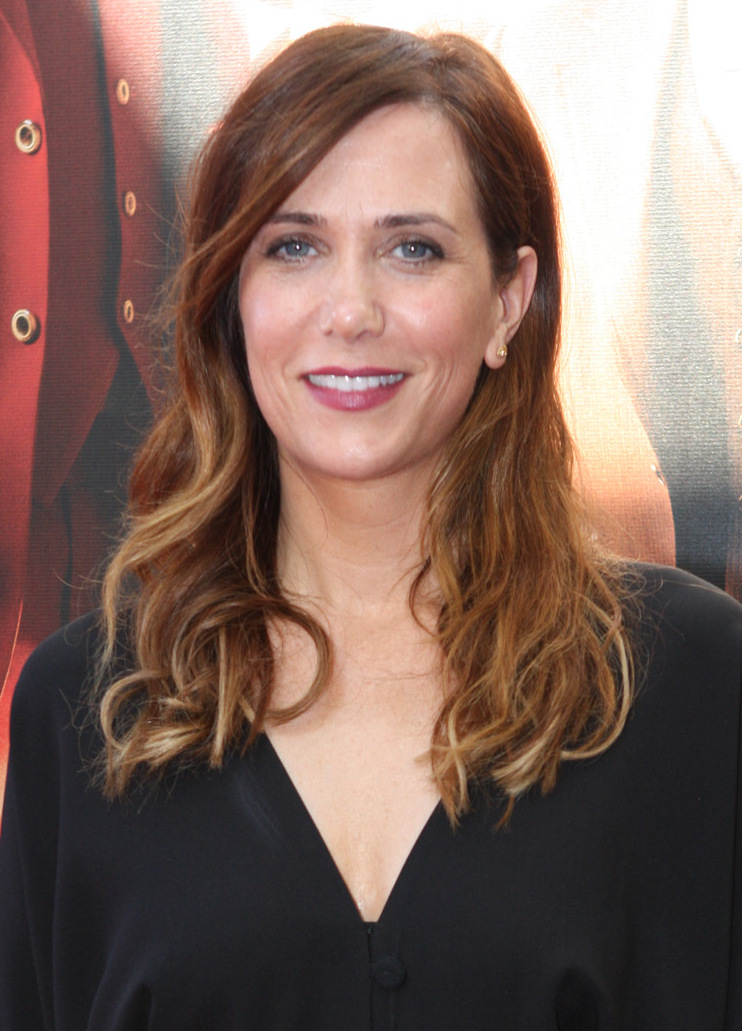
Kristen Wiig, Worst Supporting Actress winner

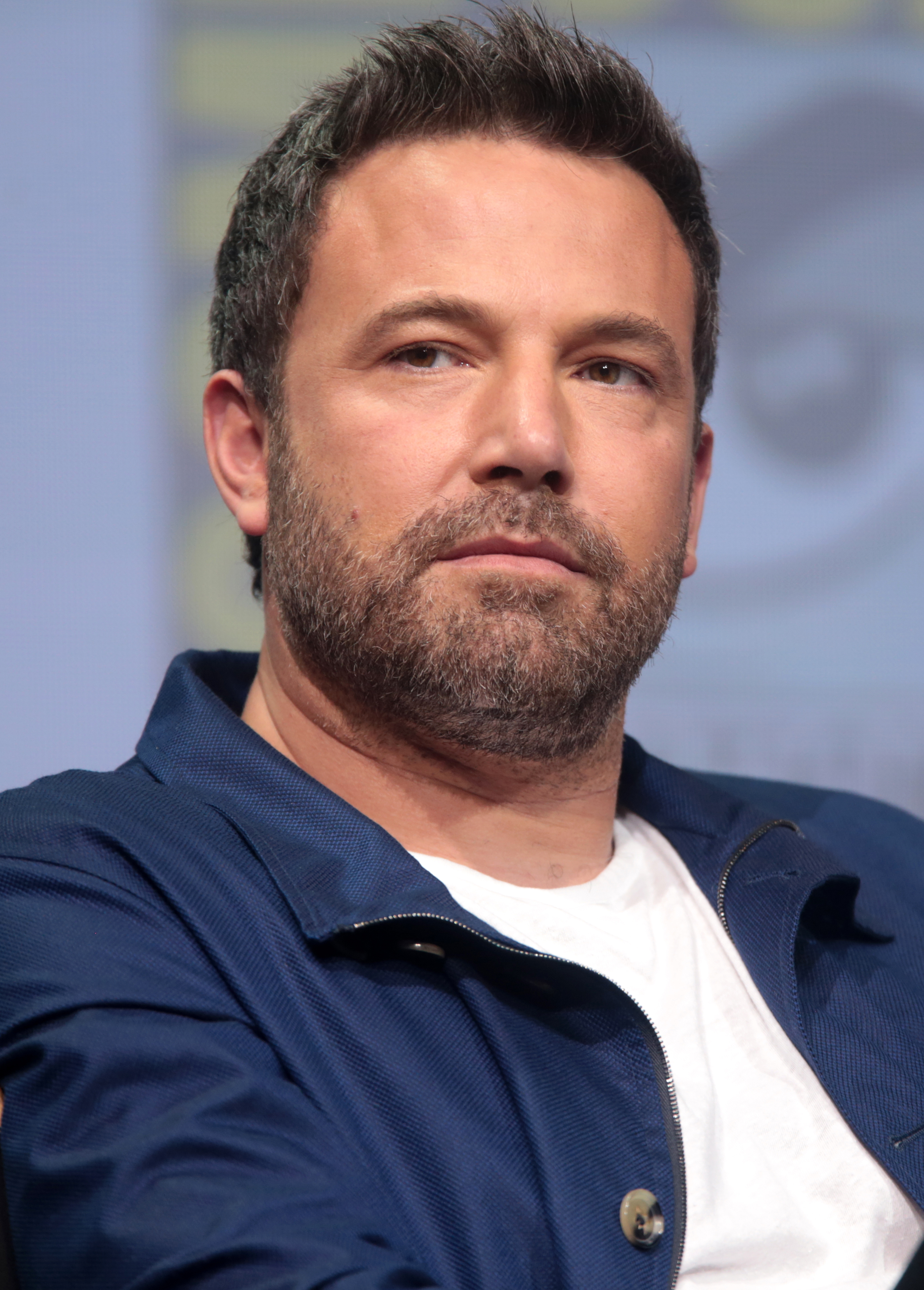
Ben Affleck, Worst Screen Combo co-winner

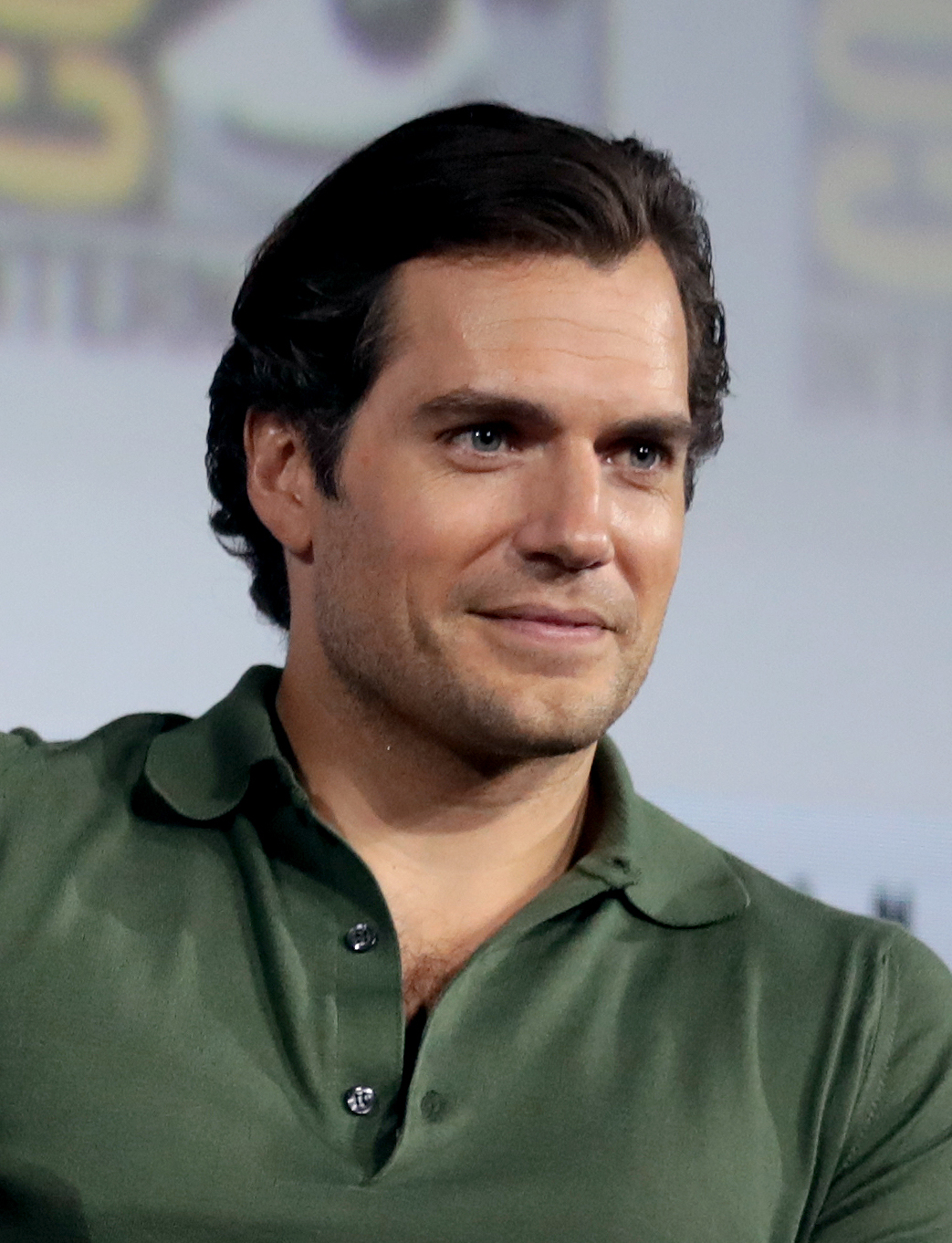
Henry Cavill, Worst Screen Combo co-winner

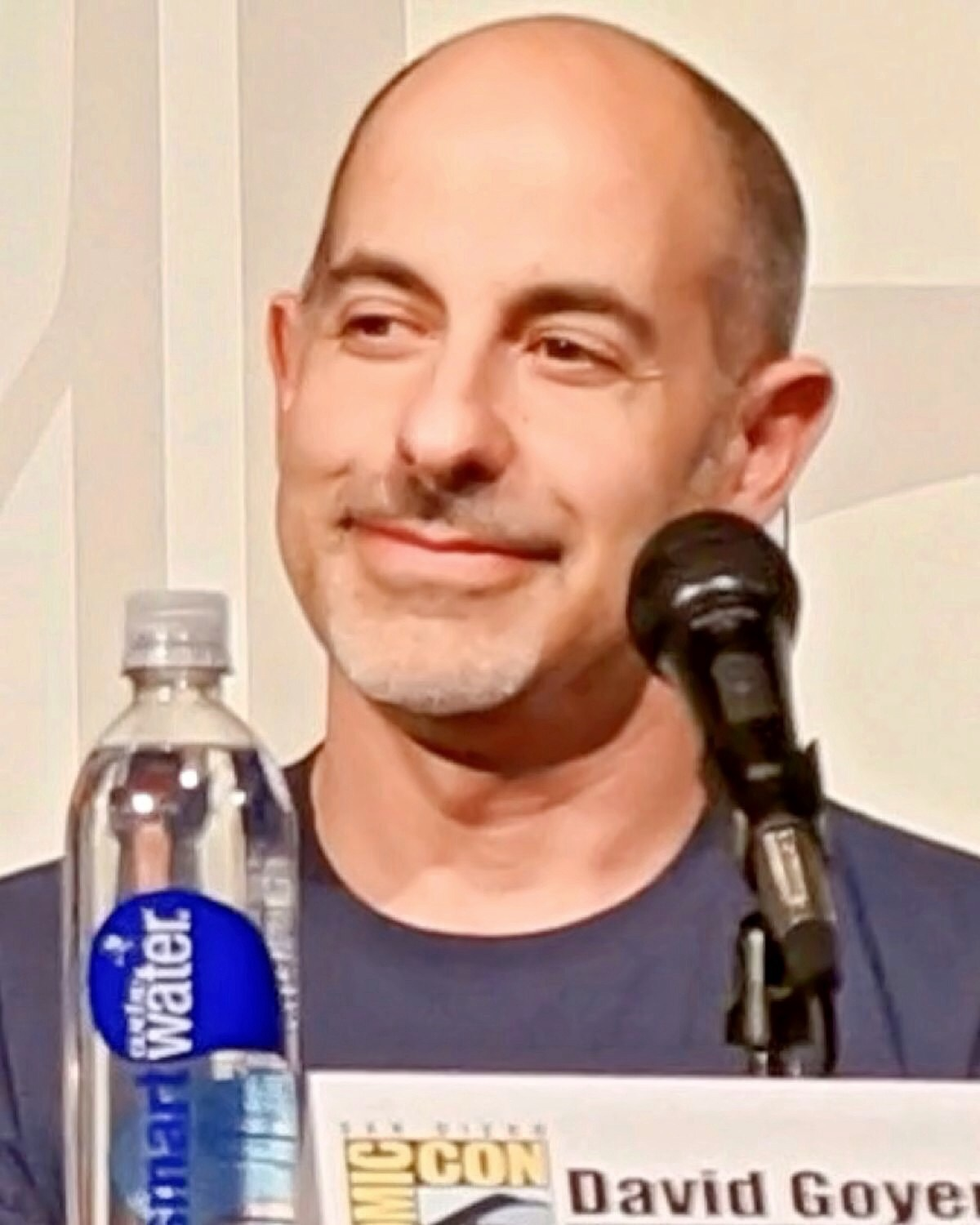
David S. Goyer, Worst Screenplay co-winner

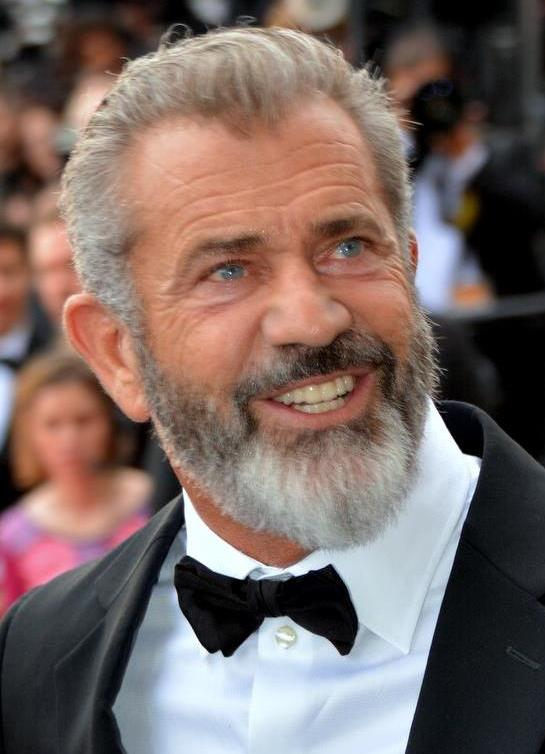
Mel Gibson, Razzie Redeemer Award winner

Batman v Superman: Dawn of Justice and Zoolander 2 led the nominations with eight. Dirty Grandpa, Gods of Egypt, Hillary's America: The Secret History of the Democratic Party, and Independence Day: Resurgence were all nominated for five, making Hillary's America: The Secret History of the Democratic Party the most nominated documentary film in the awards' history. For the first time, each category now has six nominations.

Worst Picture: Hillary's America: The Secret History of the Democratic Party (Quality Flix) – Gerald R. Molen; Batman v Superman: Dawn of Justice (Warner Bros.) – Charles Roven, Deborah Snyder; Dirty Grandpa (Lionsgate) – Bill Block, Michael Simkin, Jason Barrett, Barry Josephson; Gods of Egypt (Summit Entertainment) – Basil Iwanyk, Alex Proyas; Independence Day: Resurgence (Fox) – Dean Devlin, Harald Kloser, Roland Emmerich; Zoolander 2 (Paramount) – Stuart Cornfeld, Scott Rudin, Ben Stiller, Clayton Townsend	Worst Director: Dinesh D'Souza and Bruce Schooley for Hillary's America: The Secret History of the Democratic Party; Roland Emmerich for Independence Day: Resurgence; Tyler Perry for Boo! A Madea Halloween; Alex Proyas for Gods of Egypt; Zack Snyder for Batman v Superman: Dawn of Justice; Ben Stiller for Zoolander 2
Worst Actor: Dinesh D'Souza in Hillary's America: The Secret History of the Democratic Party as himself; Ben Affleck in Batman v Superman: Dawn of Justice as Bruce Wayne / Batman; Gerard Butler in Gods of Egypt and London Has Fallen as Set and Mike Banning (respectively); Henry Cavill in Batman v Superman: Dawn of Justice as Clark Kent / Superman; Robert De Niro in Dirty Grandpa as Richard "Dick" Kelly; Ben Stiller in Zoolander 2 as Derek Zoolander	Worst Actress: Rebekah Turner (Note: The video revealing the winners listed the nominee as "The 'Actress' Who Played Hillary Clinton". Mikaela Krantz also played a younger Hillary Clinton in the film, but only Rebekah Turner was on the official list of nominees.) in Hillary's America: The Secret History of the Democratic Party as Hillary Clinton; Megan Fox in Teenage Mutant Ninja Turtles: Out of the Shadows as April O'Neil; Tyler Perry in Boo! A Madea Halloween as Mabel "Madea" Simmons; Julia Roberts in Mother's Day as Miranda Collins; Naomi Watts in The Divergent Series: Allegiant and Shut In as Evelyn Johnson-Eaton and Mary Portman (respectively); Shailene Woodley in The Divergent Series: Allegiant as Beatrice "Tris" Prior
Worst Supporting Actor: Jesse Eisenberg in Batman v Superman: Dawn of Justice as Lex Luthor; Nicolas Cage in Snowden as Hank Forrester; Johnny Depp in Alice Through the Looking Glass as Tarrant Hightopp / The Mad Hatter; Will Ferrell in Zoolander 2 as Jacobim Mugatu; Jared Leto in Suicide Squad as The Joker; Owen Wilson in Zoolander 2 as Hansel McDonald	Worst Supporting Actress: Kristen Wiig in Zoolander 2 as Alexanya Atoz; Julianne Hough in Dirty Grandpa as Meredith Goldstein; Kate Hudson in Mother's Day as Jesse; Aubrey Plaza in Dirty Grandpa as Lenore; Jane Seymour in Fifty Shades of Black as Claire Black; Sela Ward in Independence Day: Resurgence as President Elizabeth Lanford
Worst Screen Combo: Ben Affleck and his BFF (Baddest Foe Forever) Henry Cavill in Batman v Superman: Dawn of Justice; Any two Egyptian gods or mortals in Gods of Egypt; Johnny Depp and his vomitously vibrant costume in Alice Through the Looking Glass; The entire cast of once respected actors in Collateral Beauty; Tyler Perry and that same old worn out wig in Boo! A Madea Halloween; Ben Stiller and his BFF (Barely Funny Friend) Owen Wilson in Zoolander 2	Worst Remake, Rip-off or Sequel: Batman v Superman: Dawn of Justice (Warner Bros.); Alice Through the Looking Glass (Disney); Fifty Shades of Black (Open Road); Independence Day: Resurgence (Fox); Teenage Mutant Ninja Turtles: Out of the Shadows (Paramount/Nickelodeon); Zoolander 2 (Paramount)
Worst Screenplay: Batman v Superman: Dawn of Justice – Chris Terrio and David S. Goyer, from the characters created by DC Comics; Dirty Grandpa – John M. Phillips; Gods of Egypt – Matt Sazama and Burk Sharpless; Hillary's America: The Secret History of the Democratic Party – Dinesh D'Souza and Bruce Schooley; Independence Day: Resurgence – Dean Devlin, Roland Emmerich, James Vanderbilt, James A. Woods, & Nicolas Wright; Suicide Squad – David Ayer, from the characters created by DC Comics	Razzie Redeemer Award: Mel Gibson – From Worst Supporting Actor nominee for The Expendables 3 to directing Hacksaw Ridge
The Barry L. Bumstead Award (For a movie that cost a lot and lost a lot): Misconduct (Lionsgate Premiere)

== Films with multiple nominations ==
The following thirteen films received multiple nominations:

Nominations	Film
8	Batman v Superman: Dawn of Justice
8	Zoolander 2
5	Dirty Grandpa
5	Gods of Egypt
5	Hillary's America: The Secret History of the Democratic Party
5	Independence Day: Resurgence
3	Alice Through the Looking Glass
3	Boo! A Madea Halloween
2	The Divergent Series: Allegiant
2	Fifty Shades of Black
2	Mother's Day
2	Suicide Squad
2	Teenage Mutant Ninja Turtles: Out of the Shadows

== Films with multiple wins ==
The following two films received multiple awards:

Wins	Film
4	Batman v Superman: Dawn of Justice
4	Hillary's America: The Secret History of the Democratic Party

== Box office performance of nominated films ==
Film	Budget	Box office	Net	Rotten Tomatoes	Metacritic	Ref.
Alice Through the Looking Glass	$170,000,000	$299,457,024	$129,457,024	29% (4.57/10)	34/100	
Batman v Superman: Dawn of Justice	$250,000,000	$874,360,194	$624,360,194	28% (4.91/10)	44/100	
Boo! A Madea Halloween	$20,000,000	$74,821,409	$54,821,409	20% (3.88/10)	30/100	
Collateral Beauty	$36,000,000	$75,602,001	$39,602,001	12% (3.5/10)	23/100	
Dirty Grandpa	$11,500,000	$94,073,028	$82,573,028	11% (2.76/10)	21/100	
The Divergent Series: Allegiant	$110,000,000	$179,246,868	$69,246,868	12% (4.1/10)	33/100	
Fifty Shades of Black	$5,000,000	$22,227,514	$17,227,514	7% (2.8/10)	28/100	
Gods of Egypt	$140,000,000	$150,680,864	$10,680,864	15% (3.39/10)	25/100	
Hillary's America: The Secret History of the Democratic Party	$5,000,000	$13,099,931	$8,099,931	4% (1.7/10)	2/100	
Independence Day: Resurgence	$165,000,000	$389,681,935	$224,681,935	30% (4.3/10)	32/100	
London Has Fallen	$60,000,000	$205,754,447	$145,754,447	25% (3.9/10)	28/100	
Mother's Day	$25,000,000	$43,792,859	$18,792,859	7% (2.9/10)	18/100	
Shut In	$10,000,000	$13,100,000	$3,100,000	3% (2.8/10)	22/100	
Snowden	$40,000,000	$34,308,693	-$5,691,307	60% (6.2/10)	58/100	
Suicide Squad	$175,000,000	$746,846,894	$571,846,894	27% (4.7/10)	40/100	
Teenage Mutant Ninja Turtles: Out of the Shadows	$135,000,000	$245,623,848	$110,623,848	37% (4.7/10)	40/100	
Zoolander 2	$50,000,000	$55,969,000	$5,969,000	23% (4.5/10)	34/100	

== See also ==
- 89th Academy Awards
- 70th British Academy Film Awards
- 74th Golden Globe Awards
- 23rd Screen Actors Guild Awards
- 22nd Critics' Choice Awards
