= Christina Hodson =

English screenwriter

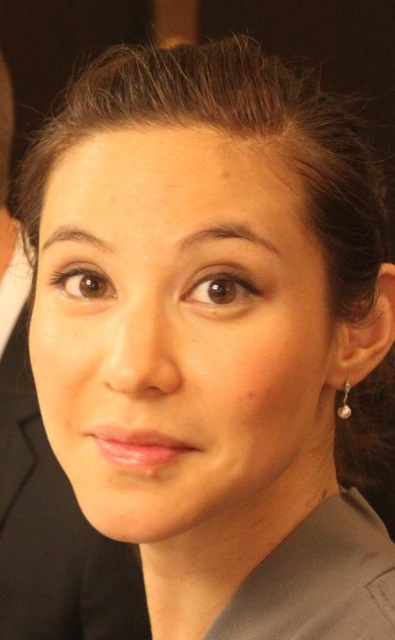
- Hodson in March 2016
- Born: London, England
- Occupation: Screenwriter
- Years active: 2012–present

Christina Hodson is an English screenwriter. She is best known for writing the films Bumblebee (2018), Birds of Prey (2020), and The Flash (2023). Her screenplay Shut In appeared on the 2012 edition of the Black List, an annual list of Hollywood's best unproduced screenplays, but the resulting film released in 2016 was critically panned. Another of her screenplays, The Eden Project, was picked up by Sony Pictures in 2014.

== Early life ==
Hodson was born and raised in London, where she was privately educated at Wimbledon High School. She is half Taiwanese and has two older sisters.

== Career ==
Hodson initially worked as a development executive in London for Focus Features. She transitioned from development executive to screenwriter in 2012 after her first screenplay, psychological thriller Shut In, made the 2012 Black List of best un-produced scripts. Hodson's Shut In was bought by David Linde's Lava Bear Films. The film, starring Naomi Watts, was directed by Farren Blackburn and released 11 November 2016.

In December 2013, Hodson's script Seed appeared on the 2013 Black List. In September 2014, Sony Pictures Entertainment acquired Hodson's female-centered sci-fi action script The Eden Project, which Tobey Maguire and Material Pictures would produce. That script later appeared on the 2014 Black List. In May 2015, Warner Bros. hired Hodson to write the new script for The Fugitive, based on the 1993 film of same name. Arnold Kopelson and Anne Kopelson would be returning as producers.

In June 2015, Hodson joined the team at Paramount Pictures tasked by Michael Bay with expanding the Transformers universe, under supervision of Akiva Goldsman. She wrote the script for Bumblebee, a Transformers film that focuses on the title character, which was released in December 2018. Travis Knight, the director of Kubo and the Two Strings, was the director. Hodson also co-wrote the script of the film Unforgettable (2017) with David Leslie Johnson, which was acquired by Warner Bros. Producer Denise Di Novi directed the film.

By October 2016, she was working on a female-centric action epic for Nina Jacobson at Color Force and Fox 2000 Pictures. The next month, it was announced she would be writing the screenplay for a Birds of Prey movie for Warner Bros., based on the DC Comics series of the same name and centered around Harley Quinn. The movie would later be titled, "Birds of Prey (and the Fantabulous Emancipation of One Harley Quinn)."

In January 2018, it was announced that Hodson was among another team of writers assembled by Paramount with Akiva Goldsman, this time to work on adapting the Ology series of books alongside writers such as Lindsey Beer, Michael Chabon, Nicole Perlman, Jeff Pinkner, and Joe Robert Cole, many of whom she previously worked with in the Transformers "brain trust." In April of that same year, it was announced that she had been hired to write a Batgirl film for Warner Bros. By July 2019, she was hired as screenwriter for the film adaptation of The Flash by Warner Bros, with the film set to be directed by It director Andy Muschietti. Like Birds of Prey, both of these films would be a part of the DC Extended Universe (DCEU). However, the release of Batgirl was cancelled following the Warner Bros. Discovery merger.

In November 2019, Hodson co-created The Lucky Exports Pitch Program with Morgan Howell and Margot Robbie, a program where six female identifying writers expanded their own logline or title into a screenplay. In October 2020, the six projects were announced, with Hodson set to produce each of them.

In June 2020, it was announced Hodson would write the script for a new Pirates of the Caribbean film starring Margot Robbie. The movie was subsequently removed from the production schedule.

In January 2023, Hodson had joined a writers' room assembled by James Gunn to map out the overarching story of the DC Universe (DCU). In the lead up to the release of Fast X, Universal Pictures announced that she would co-write the eleventh installment of the Fast & Furious franchise, which would eventually be titled Fast Forever with Oren Uziel. She was approached to write The Brave and the Bold — a Batman film directed by Muschietti, set in the DCU — in June 2023, before choosing to work on Fast Forever. In June 2024, it was announced that Zach Dean replaced Hodson and Uziel as the writer for Fast Forever. In January 2026, journalist Jeff Sneider reported that Hodson was attached to write the script to The Brave and The Bold after the project "found its way back" to her and that she was the unnamed screenwriter whom Gunn had previously referred to.

In 2025, Hodson was announced as the writer for an Untitled Firefighter Movie by Ron Howard.

Hodson is well known for her female-centric action stories.

== Filmography ==
Key
†	Denotes films that have not yet been released

Year	Title	Notes
2016	Shut In	
2017	Unforgettable	
2018	Bumblebee	
2019	Agent Burns: Welcome to Sector 7	Short film
2020	Birds of Prey	Also co-producer
2023	The Flash	
