= Clémentine Poidatz =

French actress (born 1981)

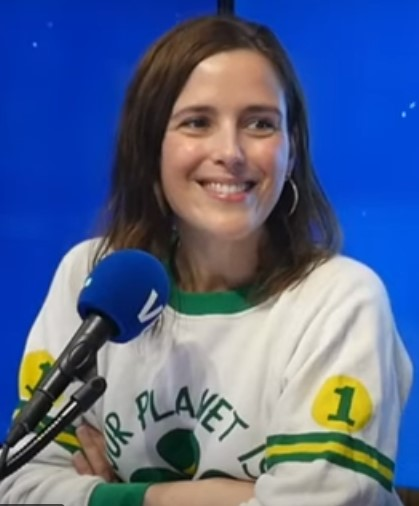
- Born: 19 June 1981 (age 44); Paris, France
- Occupation: Actress
- Years active: 2000–present

Clémentine Poidatz (born 19 June 1981) is a French actress. She studied at the Cours Florent then at the Conservatoire national supérieur d'art dramatique in Paris, France.

== Filmography ==
=== Cinema ===
- 2017 : To Each, Her Own by Myriam Aziza : Geraldine
- 2016 : Vendeur by Sylvain Desclous : Karole
- 2016 : Shut In by Farren Blackburn : Lucy
- 2015 : Les soucis by Yacine Badday
- 2014 : Les Yeux jaunes des crocodiles by Cécile Telerman : Caroline Vibert
- 2013 : Les Yeux Fermés by Jessica Palud : Mina
- 2012 : Mains armées by Pierre Jolivet : Nathalie
- 2011 : Ailleurs c'est ici by Thomas Creveuil (c.m.)
- 2008 : Un sourire malicieux éclaire son visage by Christelle Lheureux : Elle
- 2008 Hello Goodbye by Graham Guit : Gladys
- 2008 Frontier of the Dawn by Philippe Garrel : Eve
- 2007 : Could This Be Love? by Pierre Jolivet : Marina
- 2006: Marie Antoinette by Sofia Coppola : the countess of Provence

=== Television ===
- 2018 : Mars (season 2) : Amélie Durand (6 episodes)
- 2016 : Mars (season 1) : Amélie Durand (6 episodes)
- 2015 : The law of Alexandre : Eléonore Vauthier (1 episode)
- 2015 : Mars: Amélie Durand
- 2014 : Profilage Season 5 : Elisa (3 episodes)
- 2012 : Spin by Frédéric Tellier : Valentine
