= Calvin Jones (composer) =

American songwriter

Calvin P. Jones
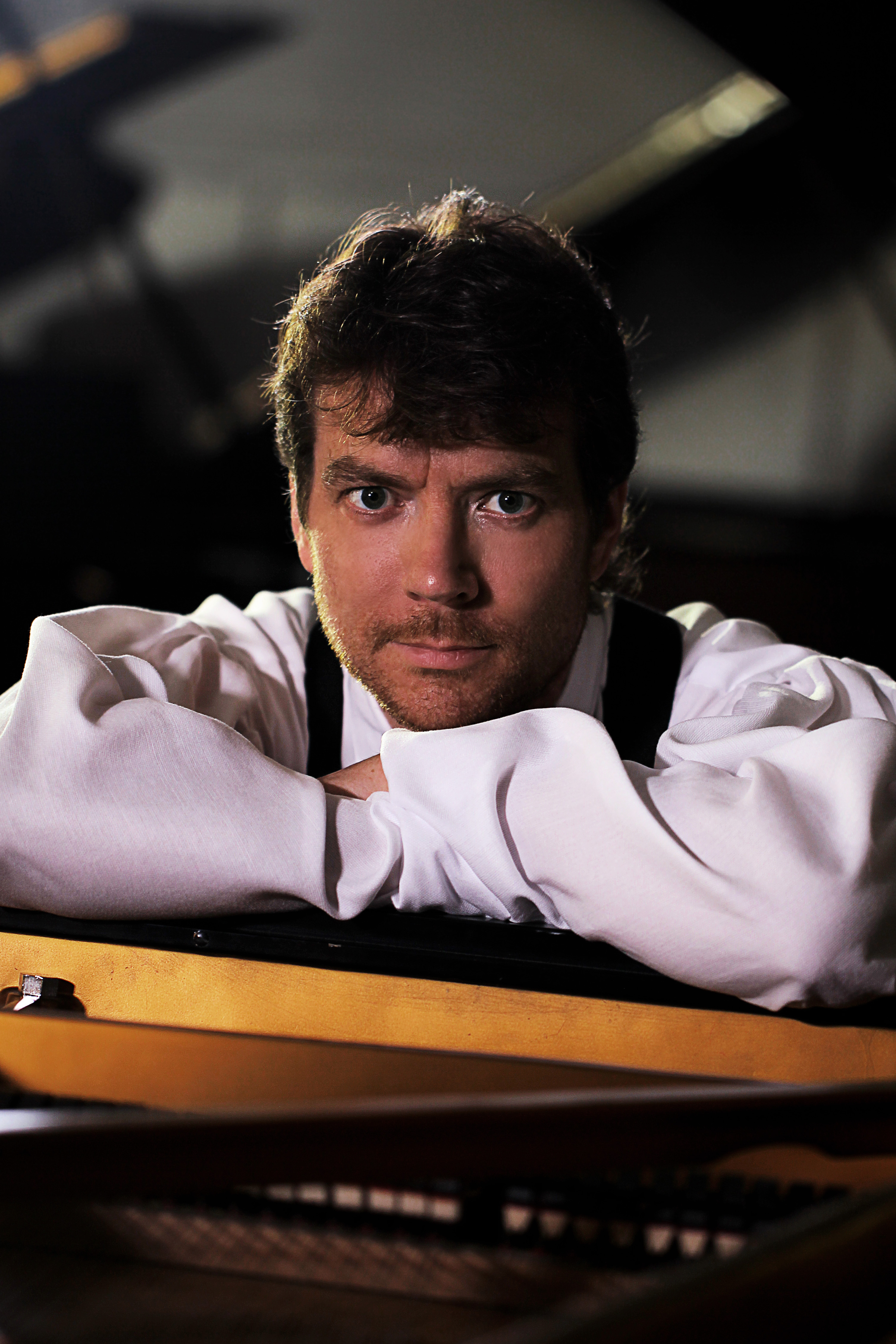
- Calvin Jones in 2013; Photo: Precords21/ Wikimedia Commons

Background information
- Born: May 3, 1966 (age 60); Eureka, South Dakota, United States
- Died: September 28, 2026 (aged 60)
- Genres: Film soundtrack, orchestral
- Occupations: Record producer, composer, songwriter, pianist
- Instrument: Piano
- Years active: 1988–2026
- Website: calvinjones.com

Calvin P. Jones (born May 3, 1966) was an American musician, record producer, composer, songwriter, and pianist. He composed the hit song "Whitewater Chopped Sticks" popular in talent shows, recitals and pageants. "Whitewater Chopped Sticks" was edited by Jones and performed by Miss Nebraska, Teresa Scanlan to win the 2011 Miss America Pageant with over 14 million viewers watching on ABC TV. Jones has composed music for many soundtracks, including the hit documentary 2016: Obama's America. Produced by Gerald R. Molen (Schindler's List, Jurassic Park), 2016 was a major theatrical release, grossing over $33.45 million at the box office, making it the second highest domestic-grossing political documentary in the United States since 1982. Jones has worked with Producer Jerry Marcellino (Michael Jackson, Diana Ross), Kerry Livgren of the group Kansas ("Dust in the Wind", "Carry On Wayward Son") and director Jim Hanon (End of the Spear) among others.

== Early life ==
Jones was born in Eureka, South Dakota, to parents Norman and Lena Jones. Shortly thereafter the family relocated to Sutton, Nebraska, where his father was pastor of the Hope Reformed Church. As with many artists, Jones' first exposure to music was in the church. He began piano lessons at the age of 6 and began composing at about age 10. The son of a minister, Jones had many opportunities to use his talents and found early on that piano was his instrument and he realized his aptitude for improvisation. His classical training was a great foundation but he approached the pieces with energy and emotion uniquely his own. At age 9 the family moved to Pierre, South Dakota. Throughout his high school and college experience, Jones was involved in the typical opportunities such as swing choir, stage band and musicals and an occasional talent show. Attending college on a musical scholarship, Jones continued to study composition. He ended his college classes with a B.S. in Economics from Hillsdale College in 1988 which has proved invaluable in the development of his musical career. Jones has started his own record company called Personal Records and managed to sign with City of Peace Records/Sony Music for distribution worldwide.

== Career ==
- 1987: Jones released his first album Through High Places at the age of 21. It was then Jones connected with art director Jim Hanon who created the original water color for this release. Later, Hanon would ask Jones for soundtracks for radio, TV and short films that he directed. Jones began doing concerts in college and university venues.
- 1990: On the heels of his first release, Calvin Jones finished his second album "Coming Home" which features some traditional Christmas classics as well as newly penned compositions. Much of the album draws its musical inspiration from the music of Handel, Vivaldi, Albinoni, Bach and other Baroque composers.
- 1993: Jones' released third album "Uncharted Waters" which spans the entire dynamic range and limitations of the piano, an acoustic tour de force picturing the great forces at work on the ocean. Popular with college age audiences Jones eventually showcased at different NACAconferences including the national NACA conference in Boston in 1994 after which he toured extensively throughout the United States. In the early 90s Jones was approached by R. J. Miller to transcribe "Whitewater Chopped Sticks". It quickly sold out of its initial printing and became an underground sensation at recitals, talent shows and pageants.
- 2000: Jones' multi-instrumental release "Acoustic Passion" is truly a paradigm shift in Calvin's music. Producer Jerry Marcellino (Michael Jackson, Diana Ross) and Kerry Livgren of Kansas fame ("Dust in the Wind") take Calvin's piano melodies to new heights.
- 2010: A turning point in Jones career occurred when director Jim Hanon invited Calvin to contribute scores and do additional production for the documentary Little Town of Bethlehem. Later that year Jones was invited to edit "Whitewater Chopped Sticks" and mentor Teresa Scanlan (Miss Nebraska 2010) in performing the edited pageant version of "Whitewater Chopped Sticks".
- 2011: On January 15, Teresa Scanlan won the Miss America 2011 title performing Calvin's song "Whitewater Chopped Sticks". Earlier that week she had won the Thursday Night Miss America Preliminary Talent award. Her success winning the crown led to the eventual studio recording "Dueling Pianos" featuring Calvin and Teresa and released through Sony/Provident Records.
- 2012: Jones' earlier work with Little Town of Bethlehem led to the invitation in 2012 to score the soundtrack for the documentary 2016: Obama's America. Jones' trailer music can be heard on the 2016 YouTube trailer, currently in excess of 1 million views.
- 2013 – 2015: Calvin Jones has since entered a new level in concerts moving from solo piano to performing with orchestras worldwide. Jones is currently producing a new album of his orchestral works.

== Discography ==
- 1987: Through High Places (solo)
- 1990: Coming Home (solo)
- 1993: Uncharted Waters (solo)
- 2000: Acoustic Passion (solo – producer Jerry Marcellino, guitars by Kerry Livgren)
- 2012: Dueling Pianos (Calvin Jones, Teresa Scanlan)
