= Mars (American TV series) =

National Geographic TV miniseries

- Genre: Drama; Science fiction
- Created by: Ben Young Mason; Justin Wilkes
- Based on: How We'll Live on Mars by Stephen Petranek
- Developed by: Ben Young Mason; André Bormanis; Mickey Fisher; Karen Janszen; Jonathan Silberberg
- Starring: Ben Cotton; Alberto Ammann; Anamaria Marinca; Clémentine Poidatz; Jihae; Sammi Rotibi; Cosima Shaw
- Composers: Nick Cave; Warren Ellis
- Country of origin: United States
- Original language: English
- No. of seasons: 2
- No. of episodes: 13

Production
- Executive producers: Ron Howard; Brian Grazer; Michael Rosenberg; Justin Wilkes; Everardo Gout; Tommy Turtle; Jonathan Silberberg; Lorenzo Mieli; Dave O'Connor; Jon Kamen; Akbar Kurtha
- Running time: 47 minutes
- Production companies: Imagine Entertainment; RadicalMedia

Original release
- Network: National Geographic
- Release: November 14, 2016 – December 17, 2018

Related
- Before Mars

Mars is a hard science-fiction television series produced by National Geographic that premiered on November 14, 2016, on its channel and FX. Prior to its official airdate, it was launched in a streaming format on November 1, 2016. It blends elements of real interviews with a fictional story of a group of astronauts as they land on the planet Mars.

The series is based on the Stephen Petranek book How We'll Live on Mars (2015). The fictional narrative initially alternates between the years 2016 and 2033, using present-day non-fiction interviews to explain events unfolding in the story. Over the series, the fictional narrative progresses through to 2042 as the colony develops. The series was filmed in Budapest and Morocco.

A companion book to the series, Mars: Our Future on the Red Planet (October 2016), details the science behind the show. A prequel episode, called Before Mars, was produced and released conjointly with the series. It tells the fictional story of a moment in the life of one of the astronauts and the decisions she made to get involved in science.

On January 13, 2017, it was announced that National Geographic had renewed the series for a second season, which premiered on November 12, 2018.

The lead actress, Jihae, confirmed via her official Instagram that the series was canceled after only two seasons.

== Premise ==
In the year 2033, a crew of six astronauts launch from Florida on a journey to be the first people to set foot on Mars. During the descent into the Martian atmosphere, there is a malfunction with their spacecraft, the Daedalus. They land 75.3 kilometers away from their planned habitat. On Earth, their progress is being monitored. In the second season, the story jumps ahead several years into the future after the Daedalus astronauts have built a full-fledged colony called Olympus Town. Having established humankind as an interplanetary species, Season 2 examines the impact that humans have on the Red Planet and the consequences the planet has on us.

Intermixed with the story is interview footage of real-life figures in the present, as well as of the fictional crew and their mission control. The real-life present-day interviews are with various scientists, engineers, and other public figures, such as Elon Musk, Susan Wise Bauer, Andy Weir, Robert Zubrin, and Neil deGrasse Tyson, among others, about the difficulties that the crew might face on a journey to, and living on, Mars.

== Cast ==
The cast for the fictional part of the first season includes:

- Ben Cotton as Ben Sawyer, American mission commander and systems engineer.
- Jihae Kim as
  - Hana Seung, American mission pilot and systems engineer, later mission commander, and
  - Joon Seung, her twin sister and CAPCOM of mission control on Earth, later secretary-general of International Mars Science Foundation, the multi-nation organization funding the Mars expedition.
- Clémentine Poidatz as Amelie Durand, French mission physician and biochemist.
- Sammi Rotibi as Robert Foucault, Nigerian mission engineer and roboticist.
- Alberto Ammann as Javier Delgado, Spanish mission hydrologist and geochemist.
- Anamaria Marinca as Marta Kamen, Russian mission exobiologist and geologist.
- Olivier Martinez as Ed Grann, CEO of the Mars Missions Corporation, consortium of private aerospace companies preparing Mars expeditions.
- Cosima Shaw as Leslie Richardson, a logistical engineer who joins the expedition to oversee the base's expansion. In Season 2, she becomes secretary-general of International Mars Science Foundation.

With the exception of Martinez and Cotton, all of these actors returned for the second season, which started production in July 2017.

=== Season 2 ===
- Esai Morales as Roland St. John, CEO of Lukrum.
- Jeff Hephner as Kurt Hurrelle, commander of the Lukrum Mars mission.
- Roxy Sternberg as Jen Carson, one of the Lukrum workers.
- Akbar Kurtha as Dr. Jay Johar
- John Light as Paul Richardson

== Production ==
The series music is composed by Nick Cave and Warren Ellis. The soundtrack for the first season was released on November 11, 2016.

For the second season, Dee Johnson took over as showrunner. Stephen Cragg and Ashley Way joined returning director Everardo Gout. Esai Morales, Roxy Sternberg, Gunnar Cauthery, Levi Fiehler, Evan Hall, Akbar Kurtha and Jeff Hephner joined the Season 2 cast.

The second season premiered in the UK and Belgium on November 11, 2018, and in the US on November 12.

== Episodes ==
Season	Episodes	Originally released	
Season	Episodes	First released	Last released
Prequel		October 26, 2016	
1	6	November 14, 2016	December 19, 2016
2	6	November 12, 2018	December 17, 2018
Special		November 12, 2018	

=== Prequel (2016) ===
No. overall	No. in season	Title	Directed by	Written by	Original release date
1	1	"Before MARS"	Lloyd Lee Choi	Story by : Rebecca Strom	October 26, 2016
"Before MARS" is the dramatic backstory of Hana & Joon Seung, principal characters in Mars. Note: It was released on YouTube one month before release of the main series.

=== Season 1 (2016) ===
No. overall	No. in season	Title	Directed by	Written by	Original release date	U.S. viewers (millions)
2	1	"Novo Mundo"	Everardo Gout	Story by : Karen Janszen; Teleplay by : Karen Janszen & Paul Solet	November 14, 2016	1.42
In 2033, the Daedalus, the first human mission to Mars, successfully enters its atmosphere. However, when the ship's thrusters go offline, the crew must fix the problem. They do and the ship lands, though their commander is injured saving the ship and they land far off course. In the present, SpaceX is attempting to land the world's first reusable rocket.
3	2	"Grounded"	Everardo Gout	Story by : André Bormanis; Teleplay by : André Bormanis & Paul Solet	November 21, 2016	0.974
The Daedalus crew battles harsh Martian terrain to reach base camp. Command changes with the death of the original commander. In reality, NASA Astronaut Scott Kelly undergoes a mission on the International Space Station, which will be the longest number of continuous days a human has spent in space.
4	3	"Pressure Drop"	Everardo Gout	Story by : Mickey Fisher; Teleplay by : Mickey Fisher & Paul Solet	November 28, 2016	0.795
In 2033, the Daedalus crew struggles to find permanent shelter, which hinges on locating a water source. Currently, the European Space Agency and Roscosmos partner to launch an orbiter.
5	4	"Power"	Everardo Gout	Story by : Ben Young Mason; Teleplay by : Ben Young Mason & Paul Solet	December 5, 2016	0.866
In 2037, four years after Mars colonization, a new phase of the MMC's expansion project begins 2 years early, however MMC's over-optimistic timeline threatens the mission. In reality, Antarctica serves as a parallel for remote human settlement.
6	5	"Darkest Days"	Everardo Gout	Paul Solet	December 12, 2016	0.738
In 2037, 8 weeks into a dust storm, the colony is on lockdown. Psychological pressure takes its toll as the crew is trapped in the habitat. The length of the storm means the base commander has to ration power. The temperature in the habitat has dropped and the doctor is checking all crew members. A botanist who loses his grip with reality, due to the decimation of his crops and the disintegration of his marriage, opens an airlock killing himself and several others. In 2016, NASA performed the simulation "HI-SEAS" mission in Mauna Loa, Hawaii to test the effects of isolation and the psychology of a crew living closely together for a period of 12 months.
7	6	"Crossroads"	Everardo Gout	Story by : André Bormanis; Teleplay by : André Bormanis & Paul Solet	December 19, 2016	0.714
In 2037, a devastating tragedy in the colony forces everyone to question the mission. On Earth an upcoming statement (presumably about the mission ending), results instead with an announcement of the discovery of life on Mars after microbiologist Mater discovers that the dust storm had blown the microbes from their main habitat to the original Russian workshop. In the present, SpaceX attempts another pioneering launch.

=== Season 2 (2018) ===
No. overall	No. in season	Title	Directed by	Written by	Original release date	U.S. viewers (millions)
8	1	"We Are Not Alone"	Stephen Cragg	Dee Johnson	November 12, 2018	0.582
It is April 2042, five years after "Crossroads". Terraforming of Mars has started with the arrival of a group of highly skilled astronauts/miners working for a for-profit corporation called Lukrum specializing in natural resource extraction. The people at Lukrum's base request water and know Commander Hana Seung of Olympus Town can't say no. Dr. Amelie Durand plans to go back to Earth. In the real-world footage, the episode shows many people, including Neil deGrasse Tyson, Andy Weir, Elon Musk and Kim Stanley Robinson talking about capitalist pursuits on Earth of Arctic oil.
9	2	"Worlds Apart"	Everardo Gout	Dee Johnson	November 19, 2018	0.413
In May 2042, Lukrum finds water on Mars and Marta Kamen demands to study it, before Lukrum can damage any potential life living therein. Dr. Amelie Durand finds out she's pregnant, maybe ending her plans to go back to earth. Hana Seung and her sister Joon Seung are reunited, but not in the way they had hoped.
10	3	"Darkness Falls"	Everardo Gout	David Gould	November 26, 2018	0.463
By August 2042, Amelie and Javier have found out that they are having a girl. A solar flare strikes Mars, knocking out power and communications to both Olympus Town and Lukrum. Marta was outside looking for life, and becomes stranded as a result of the power loss, putting her life in extreme jeopardy. Commander Seung is distracted by her grief regarding a recent personal tragedy.
11	4	"Contagion"	Stephen Cragg	Julie Hebert	December 3, 2018	0.453
Twelve hours after finding Marta, a mysterious illness kills one person in Olympus Town and makes half of Lukrum sick. Before asking the Chinese government for help, IMSF and Lukrum think of public relations to the news of a new disease on Mars. Not one to wait, Cmdr. Seung calls the Chinese orbiting space station asking for help for medication, which later arrives and prevents any more fatalities both in Olympus Town and with Lukrum. Lt.Cmdr. Mike Glenn, 2nd in command, questions Seung and asks the IMSF to be in charge of Olympus Town.
12	5	"Power Play"	Ashley Way	Paul Keables	December 10, 2018	0.359
By November 2042, Lt.Cmdr. Glenn's request to be in charge of Olympus Town is denied by the IMSF. Lukrum and Russia make a backroom deal and the IMSF are powerless. Hana Seung and Robert Foucault search for water, and Robert tells Hana he is quitting Olympus Town to work for Lukrum. Both try to kindle a budding relationship, which fails as Hana is devoted to the mission. Glenn cuts power to Lukrum after exceeding the power agreement, unknowingly jeopardizing the entire Lukrum base. When Cmdr. Seung later finds out, Lt.Cmdr. Glenn is confined to his quarters. Amelie later goes into premature labor two months early and gives birth.
13	6	"The Shakeup"	Ashley Way	Dee Johnson	December 17, 2018	0.391
By December 2042, Lukrum uses an underground explosion to locate liquid water but this action also causes marsquakes. Lukrum colony gets hit worst with several dead, including their commander who searched the wrecked station for survivors and was asphyxiated when his spacesuit was damaged. On Earth Lukrum's CEO tries to downplay the cause of the quake and buys his way into IMSF, only to get stumped by IMSF director Richardson who hands the show to Olympus Town where Seung reveals the truth about the quake and Amelie and Javier present their baby, Gabriella Durand Delgado, to the audience on Earth. In the final scene three years later in May 2045, the team looks at the first cloud on a satellite image and celebrates evidence of their efforts in terraforming Mars.

=== Special (2018) ===
No. overall	No. in season	Title	Directed by	Original release date
Special	1	"Inside SpaceX"	Julia Reagan	November 12, 2018
"Inside SpaceX" is the overview about SpaceX's key moments (some of it had been already aired on some episodes) such as first Falcon 1 flight, attempted booster landing, until Falcon Heavy Test Flight.

== Reception ==
=== Critical response ===
The first season of Mars received mixed reviews, holding a 61% approval rating on Rotten Tomatoes with an average score of 7.33/10 based on 18 reviews; in 2018, the critical consensus stated:

"Ron Howard's direction ensures that Mars is an attractive endeavor, even if the show struggles to move smoothly between its documentary and fictional elements."

On Metacritic, the first season has received a score of 59 out of 100 based on 14 reviews, indicating "mixed or average reviews".

=== Accolades ===
Award	Category	Recipient(s)	Result	Ref.
Saturn Awards	Best Television Presentation	Mars	Nominated	

== See also ==
=== Factual ===
- Falcon 9 flight 20, a flight of Falcon 9 that landed an orbital class booster on land for the first time in history, shown on the final episode of the first season of Mars
- SpaceX Starship, in development by SpaceX
- Space Launch System (SLS), in development by NASA and Boeing
- Mars Design Reference Mission, the standing NASA plans for hypothetical crewed missions to Mars

=== Fictional ===
- Away (TV series)
- The Expanse (TV series)
- The First (TV series)
