= David Linde =

American businessman and film producer

- Born: February 8, 1960 (age 66)
- Occupations: Businessman and film producer
- Notable work: Arrival (producer)
- Spouse: Felicia Rosenfeld

David Linde (born February 8, 1960) is an American businessman and film producer. He is the CEO of the Sundance Institute. Prior to Sundance, Linde previously served as CEO of Participant Media, chairman of Universal Pictures, a co-founder of Focus Features, a partner of Good Machine, and owner of Lava Bear Films, where he produced Arrival. Films released during his tenures collectively earned more than $15 billion globally, with 204 Oscar nominations and 46 wins.

== Early life and education ==
Linde was born and raised in Eugene, the son of law professor and Oregon Supreme Court Justice, Hans A. Linde and Helen Tucker Linde. His father was Jewish and his mother is Presbyterian. In 1978, Linde graduated from South Eugene High School. After attending Swarthmore College, he moved to New York City where his girlfriend (later his wife) had moved. In New York, he worked as a paralegal for Paramount Pictures from 1984 to 1988 where he supervised sales of select international theatrical rights; and then as co-head of the international department at Fox Lorber Associates from 1988 to 1991 where he directed the sales of more than 300 independently produced film, documentary and television titles.

== Career ==
Linde joined Miramax Films in 1991 as Vice President of Acquisitions before being promoted to Executive Vice President and Head of Sales as the founding executive of Miramax Films International. While at Miramax, he oversaw the international distribution of Quentin Tarantino's Pulp Fiction, Woody Allen's Mighty Aphrodite, Wes Craven's Scream and Anthony Minghella's multi-Academy Award-winning The English Patient.

Linde was both co-president and partner of the production company Good Machine and President and founder of Good Machine International, beginning in January 1997. GMI handled the international distribution of films including Ang Lee's Crouching Tiger, Hidden Dragon (of which Linde was executive producer), Alfonso Cuaron's Y tu mamá también (of which Linde was executive producer). Joel Coen and Ethan Coen's The Man Who Wasn't There, and Todd Field's In the Bedroom. Films distributed by GMI earned six Academy Awards from 22 nominations, including two for Best Picture and five Golden Globes from 18 nominations. While at Good Machine, Linde also executive produced Todd Solondz's Happiness. In 2002, Linde and his partners sold the Good Machine companies to Universal Pictures and created Focus Features.

As co-president of Focus Features and president of its genre production unit, Rogue Pictures. Linde oversaw a slate that featured Roman Polanski's The Pianist, Sofia Coppola's Lost in Translation and Fernando Meirelles' The Constant Gardener, as well as Ang Lee's Brokeback Mountain. During Linde's tenure at Focus, the company was honored with 53 Oscar nominations resulting in 11 Academy Awards. In 2008, Linde oversaw the sale of Rogue Pictures to Relativity Media.

In 2002, Linde was promoted to co-chairman of Universal Pictures and subsequently, Chairman. During his tenure, Universal significantly grew its international distribution and production platform across all media and launched Universal's family/animation banner, Illumination Entertainment.

In 2011, Linde founded Lava Bear Films, a film production and financing company developing projects specifically designed for the global marketplace, and was the company's CEO.

Linde has long-lasting relationships in global filmmaking, most recently as executive producer of Alejandro González Iñárritu's Academy Award-nominated Biutiful, producer of Fernando Meirelles' 360, and as executive producer of Zhang Yimou's The Flowers of War starring Christian Bale. Most recently, Linde executive produced Yimou's Coming Home which premiered at the 2014 Cannes Film Festival, Jonas Cuaron's Desierto, and Alfonso Cuaron's Roma.

During his tenure as CEO of Participant from 2015 to 2023, the company's films included Academy Award for Best Picture winners, Spotlight and Green Book; Oscar winner for Best Documentary Feature, American Factory; Oscar winners for Best Foreign Language Film, Roma and A Fantastic Woman; as well as acclaimed, award-winning long-form content including Steve James' docuseries America to Me and Ava DuVernay's When They See Us. In 2022, Linde oversaw the reorganization of Participant's operations to create a campaigns and engagement department that extended the reach and impact of the company's films through a combination of impact campaigning integrated with marketing, digital resources, and social media.

== Filmography ==
Executive producer

- Great Performances (1992) (TV series)
- Happiness (1998)
- Ride with the Devil (1999)
- The King Is Alive (2000)
- Crouching Tiger, Hidden Dragon (2000)
- Storytelling (2001)
- Y tu mamá también (2001)
- They (2002)
- How to Deal (2003)
- Biutiful (2010)
- 360 (2011)
- The Flowers of War (2011)
- Coming Home (2014)
- Desierto (2015)
- The Bodyguard (2016)
- Shut In (2016)
- Roma (2018)
- Stillwater (2021)

Producer

- 360 (2011)
- The Rover (2014)
- The Forest (2016)
- Arrival (2016)

Thanks

- Clerks (1994)
- The Tao of Steve (2000)
- 21 Grams (2003)
- Agora (2009)
- Mama (2013)
- Birdman (2014)
- Above Suspicion (2019)
- The King (2019)

== Recognition ==
Linde has received awards including The Will Rogers Motion Picture Pioneer of the Year, General Electric's chairman's Award for Performance Turnaround, the Anti-Defamation League's Distinguished Entertainment Industry Award, the 21st Israel Film Festival – Visionary Award, New York Magazine: Best Of The Industry Award, the Gotham Award For Distinguished Achievement, the EmPOWerment Award at Variety's Power of Women event. In 2020, Linde received an honorary degree from Swarthmore College. Linde did two terms on the Academy of Motion Picture Arts and Sciences’ board of governors and as a treasurer, its Museum Foundation Board of Trustees, and the Academy Foundation board of trustees. He is on the board of directors of the British Academy of Film And Television Arts (North America), Film Independent's Board of Directors, American Film Institute's Board of Trustees, and the advisory council of Brooklyn College's Feirstein Graduate School of Cinema.

== Personal life ==
Linde is married to Felicia Rosenfeld.
