= The Forest (2016 American film) =

2016 film by Jason Zada

- Theatrical release poster
- Directed by: Jason Zada
- Written by: Ben Ketai; Sarah Cornwell; Nick Antosca
- Produced by: Tory Metzger; David S. Goyer; David Linde
- Starring: Natalie Dormer; Taylor Kinney; Yukiyoshi Ozawa; Eoin Macken
- Cinematography: Mattias Troelstrup
- Edited by: Jim Flynn
- Music by: Bear McCreary
- Production companies: AI-Film; Lava Bear Films; Phantom Four Films
- Distributed by: Gramercy Pictures; Focus Features
- Release date: January 8, 2016 (United States)
- Running time: 93 minutes
- Country: United States
- Language: English
- Budget: $10 million
- Box office: $39.7 million

The Forest is a 2016 American supernatural horror film directed by Jason Zada, based on a screenplay by Ben Ketai, Nick Antosca, and Sarah Cornwell. The film stars Natalie Dormer, Taylor Kinney, Yukiyoshi Ozawa, and Eoin Macken.

The film was released in the United States on January 8, 2016, by Gramercy Pictures. It received negative reviews from critics and grossed $39 million worldwide against a production budget of $10 million.

== Plot ==
Sara Price receives notice from Japanese authorities that her twin sister Jess is presumed dead, after entering Aokigahara forest, a place frequently chosen for suicide. Despite her fiancé Rob's concern, Sara travels to Japan and checks into the hotel where Jess was last staying.

At the hotel, she meets Aiden, a travel journalist, and they quickly bond with each other. Sara confides that her parents died in a car crash right outside the family home; Jess saw the bodies while Sara did not. Sara attributes her sister's mental health issues to this episode and regrets not "sharing the burden" by looking at the bodies as well. Aiden reveals a similar relationship, as his brother lost hearing in one ear as the result of a fight Aiden did not join. He now feels obligated to always help his brother in a manner similar to Sara with Jess.

Aiden then offers to accompany Sara into the forest along with a local guide, Michi. In exchange, Sara permits Aiden to write an article about her search for Jess. Michi warns that people who enter Aokigahara often carry emotional pain and may be vulnerable to supernatural forces. However, he also says that these forces can create illusions, in order to cause victims to hurt themselves.

While searching the forest, the group finds a yellow tent that Sara recognizes as Jess's. As night falls, Michi advises them to leave a note and return in the morning, but Sara insists on staying. Aiden stays with her. That night, Sara hears noises and follows them, encountering a mysterious girl named Hoshiko, who warns her not to trust Aiden and implies he is lying about Jess. Hoshiko flees and Sara falls over trying to follow, severely cutting her hand.

The next day, Aiden insists on escorting Sara out of the forest to receive medical attention. Sara is now suspicious of Aiden, and when he seems to be acting deceptive about their route, she confronts him. Aiden maintains that he never met Jess, but Sara forces him to admit that he lies about having a brother in order to get close to her. Sara revokes permission to be used in his story and demands his phone so she can delete audio recordings of her. Sara sees a photo of Jess on the phone and starts to believe Aiden is involved in her disappearance.

Sara runs from Aiden but falls into a cave, where she encounters Hoshiko again who reveals herself to be a yūrei, a malevolent spirit. Sara narrowly escapes Hoshiko, but finds a flip camera in the cave that shows images of her father's murder-suicide of her mother, revealing that Sara lied to Aiden about her parents' death. Aiden soon finds her and helps her out of the cave, with Sara telling Aiden she realises the mountain made her see a photo that did not really exist. Meanwhile, Rob arrives in Japan and joins Michi and a search party to locate the sisters.

Aiden leads Sara to a ranger station he claims to have suddenly found. While Aiden tries to fix the radio set, Sara notices a locked door from behind which she hears Jess's voice, and they pass several notes that implicate Aiden as her kidnapper. Sara stabs and kills him, only to realize that Aiden was innocent: the voice and note were more malevolent illusions. Sara then sees a vision of her father's ghost, it grabs her wrist and she escaped only by severing his fingers. She runs through the forest and sees Jess approaching the search party in the distance. Sara calls out but is not heard. It is then revealed she has fatally injured herself attacking the illusion of her father, and she never escaped the basement where she dies and yūrei drag her into the ground.

Jess, very much alive, is rescued by the search party and explains that the "feeling" of her sister is gone, and it is assumed that Jess knows Sara is dead. As the search party leaves, Michi spots a dark figure in the forest and realizes it is Sara, now a vengeful yūrei.

== Cast ==
- Natalie Dormer as Sara and Jess Price
- Taylor Kinney as Aiden
- Eoin Macken as Rob
- Stephanie Vogt as Valerie
- Yukiyoshi Ozawa as Michi
- Rina Takasaki as Hoshiko
- Noriko Sakura as Mayumi
- Yûho Yamashita as Sakura
- Akiko Iwase as Head Teacher
- Masashi Fujimoto as Yurei

== Production ==
Goyer came up with the idea after reading a Wikipedia article on Aokigahara. Surprised that a horror film had not been made about it, he came up with a rough outline. After being pitched the idea, Zada instantly became attracted to it. He was most attracted because the "suicide forest" in Aokigahara was a real place, which he became "obsessed with", reading as much information as he could about the location, including watching an online Vice documentary. Prior to the shooting, Zada took a trip to Aokigahara, as he felt, "There's no way I felt that I could make a movie about a real place, and not go visit it." Zada had described the location as "...a very frightening place. It was not a place where I wanted to spend the night."

In October 2014, Natalie Dormer joined the cast in the dual roles of Sara and Jess Price. Dormer was drawn to the project as she was able to portray two different characters at the same time.

In April 2015, Taylor Kinney was cast in a supporting role. He cited his interest in the story's psychological thriller elements, the script, and the chance to work with Dormer.

=== Filming ===
Principal photography began on May 17, 2015, in Tokyo, Japan. As filming in the Aokigahara forest is not permitted by the government, the filmmakers chose a forest near the Tara Mountain in Serbia to double as the Japanese forest in which the film is set. Poor weather plagued the production in Serbia, and many scenes were shot in a former warehouse.

== Release ==
In May 2014, Focus Features acquired domestic distribution rights to the film. On May 20, 2015, Focus Features relaunched their Gramercy Pictures label for action, horror, and science-fiction movies, with the film being one of its releases. The film was released in the United States on January 8, 2016.

In May 2014, Focus Features acquired the domestic distribution rights to The Forest. On May 20, 2015, Focus relaunched its Gramercy Pictures label to distribute genre films, including action, horror, and science fiction titles, with The Forest announced as one of its initial releases under the revived banner. The film was theatrically released in the United States on January 8, 2016, and was later released on DVD and Blu-ray on April 12, 2016.

== Reception ==
=== Box office ===
The Forest grossed $26.6 million in the United States and Canada and $13.1 million in other territories, for a worldwide total of $39.7 million against a production budget of $10 million.

The film was released on January 8, 2016, alongside the wide release of The Revenant, and was projected to earn between $8 million and $10 million from 2,451 theaters in its opening weekend. It earned $515,000 from Thursday night previews and $5 million on its opening day, including those early screenings. The film went on to debut with $12.7 million over the weekend, finishing fourth at the box office behind Star Wars: The Force Awakens ($41.6 million), The Revenant ($38 million), and Daddy's Home ($15 million).

=== Critical response ===
On the review aggregator Rotten Tomatoes, the film holds an approval rating of 10% based on 138 reviews, with an average rating of 4.1/10. The website's consensus reads: "The Forest offers Natalie Dormer more than a few chances to showcase her range in a dual role, but they aren't enough to offset the fact that the movie's simply not all that scary." On Metacritic, it has a weighted score of 34 out of 100, based on 30 critics, indicating "generally unfavorable reviews". Audiences polled by CinemaScore gave the film an average grade of "C" on an A+ to F scale.

Brian Truitt of USA Today gave the film two out of four stars, describing it as a "mostly scare-free zone". Peter Keough of The Boston Globe slightly praised the performances of Dormer and Kinney but said "their characters undergo such unlikely psychological contortions that these efforts are to no avail".

Alonso Duralde of TheWrap called Taylor Kinney's performance "wooden", and the film "turns out to be so generally inept and non-scary that to boycott it would give the film more attention than it deserves". Writing for The New York Times, Neil Genzlinger the film a "decently executed creeper" anchored by Dormer's work. Justin Chang of Variety noted the muddled script but praises the "spooky sense of mystery" from Zada.

David Ehrlich of Slate criticized the film's release, citing it as part of a January trend of underwhelming horror films. He compared the practice to the Japanese myth of ubasute, in which elderly people who could no longer take care of themselves were abandoned to their fate on a mountain.

== Controversy ==
The film attracted controversy for what some believed to be trivializing the issue of suicide in Japan, as well as disrespecting the people who have died in the real-life forest. Critic Kevin Maher wrote in his review, "The Forest is a dumb and dreary horror movie that's notable only for its racial insensitivities, lack of horror, and for making Natalie Dormer from Game of Thrones play identical twins distinguished only by hair colour."

The film's plot has been compared to the 2011 comic book The Suicide Forest, also taking place in the Aokigahara, written by El Torres and illustrated by Gabriel Hernández.

== See also ==
- List of horror films of 2016
- The Sea of Trees
- Grave Halloween
- Forest of the Living Dead
