= Hillary's America: The Secret History of the Democratic Party =

- Theatrical release poster
- Directed by: Dinesh D'Souza; Bruce Schooley
- Written by: Dinesh D'Souza; Bruce Schooley
- Produced by: Gerald R. Molen
- Starring: Dinesh D'Souza
- Narrated by: Dinesh D'Souza
- Music by: Stephen Limbaugh
- Production company: D'Souza Media
- Distributed by: Quality Flix
- Release date: July 15, 2016 (United States)
- Running time: 106 minutes
- Country: United States
- Language: English
- Budget: $5 million
- Box office: $13.1 million

Hillary's America: The Secret History of the Democratic Party is a 2016 political documentary about 2016 American presidential candidate Hillary Clinton and a critique of the Democratic Party. The film is written and directed by conservative political commentator Dinesh D'Souza and Bruce Schooley. The film had a limited release on July 15, 2016, before a wide release on July 22, 2016, and accompanies a book by D'Souza by the same name.

The film was the top-grossing political documentary of 2016, grossing $13 million against a $5 million budget. It was heavily panned by critics; review aggregation website Metacritic declared it the worst-received film of 2016. It was nominated for five Golden Raspberry Awards, and won four, including Worst Picture (a first for a documentary film), as well as Worst Director and Worst Actor for D'Souza.

== Background ==
Dinesh D'Souza, a conservative author and commentator who co-directed Hillary's America, is known for also directing 2016: Obama's America (2012), which criticized incumbent president Barack Obama during the 2012 presidential election, and America: Imagine the World Without Her (2014) arguing against liberal critiques of its history, including the theft of Native American and Mexican lands, black slavery, contemporary foreign policy, and its capitalist system.

== Synopsis ==
The film begins with scenes of D'Souza at the halfway house where he spent time due to his conviction for making an illegal political contribution. The film then switches to examining and criticizing the history of the Democratic Party, from Andrew Jackson to the present day. D'Souza is portrayed going into a basement archive of the DNC Headquarters where he reveals secrets of the party's history.

The film offers an interpretation of the origins of the Democratic Party in a brief outline, then examines the racism of one of its founders, President Andrew Jackson. It goes on to describe how Jackson and the Democratic Party passed legislation that brutally expelled Native Americans from their land and created the reservation system. This is followed by a political analysis of the historical record of the Democratic Party in the North and South in supporting and defending the institution of slavery and ensuring its spread into the western territories. It examines the founding of the Republican Party which D'Souza personally suggests was a reaction to the support of slavery by the Democratic Party and their endorsement and defense of fugitive slave laws.

The film then argues the Democratic Party opposed the Reconstruction Amendments to the United States Constitution. The film argues that the Democratic Party had close ties to the Ku Klux Klan in the 19th and 20th centuries, including the accusation that Democratic President Woodrow Wilson supported the KKK and racial segregation, opposed anti-lynching legislation, manipulated New Deal legislation in the 1930s to keep African Americans from benefiting, and opposed civil rights legislation of the 1960s.

The film also examines the validity of the common argument made by leaders of the Democratic Party that the parties "switched positions", with the Democratic Party becoming progressive and Southern racists becoming Republicans, which it rebuts by arguing that fewer than 1 percent of Southern Democrats who opposed civil rights legislation changed parties.

External videos
- The Star-Spangled Banner excerpt on YouTube

The film examines the record of the Democratic Party in its use of social welfare programs and machine politics, particularly in urban areas, to create what has been described as a new plantation system, enabling the Democratic Party to exploit and coerce residents. The film then describes the rise and activities of radicals such as Saul Alinsky, who D'Souza believes affected both Barack Obama and Hillary Clinton greatly. The film proceeds to examine and criticize the actions of Clinton, questioning her ethics, honesty, and motivations. The last 15 minutes of the film comprise the renditions of three songs: God Bless America, sung by Deborah "Debbie" Fancher, D'Souza's then-recently married wife, The Star-Spangled Banner, sung by a young girl and an orchestra in accompaniment, and Stand Up and Say So by the Gatlin Brothers, the former two interspersed with stock footage of Americana and Revolutionary War imagery.

In a post-credits scene, Dinesh D'Souza appears in front of a classroom, where he is "teaching immigrants English as a second language as a form of community service," saying "So how will you know when you have become an American? You'll know, when you become a Republican", followed by an applause by the students in the classroom.

== Interviews ==
D'Souza presents various interviews in the film, including:

- Carol M. Swain – political scientist, professor of political science and law at Vanderbilt University, and former television host
- Jonah Goldberg – conservative syndicated columnist, author and commentator
- Peter Schweizer – author, political consultant, and author of the book and movie Clinton Cash

== Release ==
Hillary's America had a limited release on July 15, 2016, playing in three theaters in Dallas, Houston, and Phoenix, and making a box office of $77,500 (~$98,989 in 2024). The success of the film during that period was described as "massively frontloaded" because it made about $41,000 on the first day. On July 22, 2016, Hillary's America got a nationwide expansion, entering 1,217 theaters. This date fell between the end of the 2016 Republican National Convention and the beginning of the 2016 Democratic National Convention. On its opening weekend, the film's box office was $3.7 million, in the top ten that weekend. On July 23, 2016, Larry Gatlin and the Gatlin Brothers released the music video "Stand Up and Say So (Hillary's America)", a song they wrote and performed for the film.

== Reception ==
=== Box office ===
Hillary's America: The Secret History of the Democratic Party became the highest grossing documentary of 2016 and the 20th-highest domestically of all-time, grossing $13.1 million in at the box office. In its opening weekend of wide release it grossed $4 million, finishing 9th at the box office.

=== Critical response ===
On the review aggregator website Rotten Tomatoes, 4% of 27 critics' reviews are positive. The website's consensus reads: "Hillary's America: The Secret History of the Democratic Party finds Dinesh D'Souza once again preaching to the right-wing choir -- albeit less effectively than ever." Metacritic, which uses a weighted average, assigned the film a score of 2 out of 100, based on 17 critics, indicating "overwhelming dislike". The film has the second all-time lowest score in the site's history, after six films (The Garbage Pail Kids Movie, Bio-Dome, The Singing Forest, Chaos, United Passions and Death of a Nation [also directed by D'Souza]) tied with a score of 1.

Alan Zilberman's Washington Post review called the film "too incoherent for argument" and boring, its only redeeming moments being unintentional comedy, while Glenn Kenny wrote in The New York Times that it was a masterpiece if the criterion for evaluation were "the extent to which it communicates the personality and character of its director."

In a review for IndieWire, film critic David Ehrlich wrote, "This is the same old dog and pony show upon which D'Souza has built his brand. It's his usual shtick of piggybacking a baseless personal attack onto a pseudo history lesson, a feature-length dog whistle that's blown at a pitch so high that only the most ignorant or paranoid of people are capable of hearing it." Writing in The Guardian, Jordan Hoffman described the film as "paranoid" and "so demented that no synopsis could do it justice" and D'Souza as a "simpleton". He goes on to say that the basis of the film, the "purposely misunderstood fact" that "the Republicans used to be the good guys when it came to the issue of racial equality in America" is as surprising a discovery as the Soviet Union being an ally of the United States in World War II because: "things change, and labels are semantics, and the concepts that bind a political party then might not be the same ones that bind them now." Dann Gire of the Boston Herald called the film "an embarrassment to propaganda films", full of "mind-boggling conspiracy theories" and "fried thoughts and lapses of basic journalistic practices".

Alex Shephard of The New Republic said: "Because he is a very dumb man, D'Souza doesn't even make a credible argument that Bill and Hillary are corrupt, even though in many ways it's low-hanging fruit. Instead, like every fringe weirdo who comes after the Clintons does, he overreaches and invents an absurd conspiracy ... It's not enough for, say, the Clinton Foundation to have taken money from, say, Saudi Arabia—instead, Clinton is literally presented as selling America to foreign countries. Why? D'Souza never explains."

John Fund of National Review stated that "[the film] is over the top in places and definitely selective, but the troubling facts are accurate and extensively documented in the D'Souza book that accompanies the movie [and that] the film is intensely patriotic". The River Cities' Reader's Mike Schulz commented that "while there was the expected applause at the end, it also came right after a particularly adventurous, quite captivating performance of “The Star-Spangled Banner,” and, y'know, congregated crowds are supposed to applaud the National Anthem...It was actually the movie itself that was all but foaming at the mouth."

=== Accolades ===
Award	Category	Recipient(s)	Result	Ref.
Golden Raspberry Awards (37th)	Worst Picture	Gerald R. Molen	Won	
Golden Raspberry Awards (37th)	Worst Director	Dinesh D'Souza and Bruce Schooley	Won	
Golden Raspberry Awards (37th)	Worst Screenplay	Dinesh D'Souza and Bruce Schooley	Nominated	
Golden Raspberry Awards (37th)	Worst Actor	Dinesh D'Souza (as himself)	Won	
Golden Raspberry Awards (37th)	Worst Actress	The "Actress" Who Played Hillary Clinton (Rebekah Turner)	Won	

In response to the Golden Raspberry Awards nominations, D'Souza stated that he was "actually quite honored" and called the nominations "petty revenge" in response to Trump's election and that "the film might have played an important role in the election." After learning his film had won four of its five nominations, D'Souza recorded a short video accepting the awards, where he stated that winning because the voters were upset for Clinton's defeat was positive because "my audience loves the fact that you hate me".

=== Other ===
On July 23, 2016, Donald Trump, the Republican presidential nominee (and eventual victor) against Clinton, called on supporters to see the film.

== See also ==
- Hillary: The Movie – a 2008 documentary produced by Citizens United
- Political cinema
- History of the United States Democratic Party
- History of the United States Republican Party
- Historian's fallacy
- Southern strategy
- Andrew Johnson
- War Democrat
- List of documentary films
- Michael Moore in TrumpLand (2016)
