= Shan Serafin =

American novelist

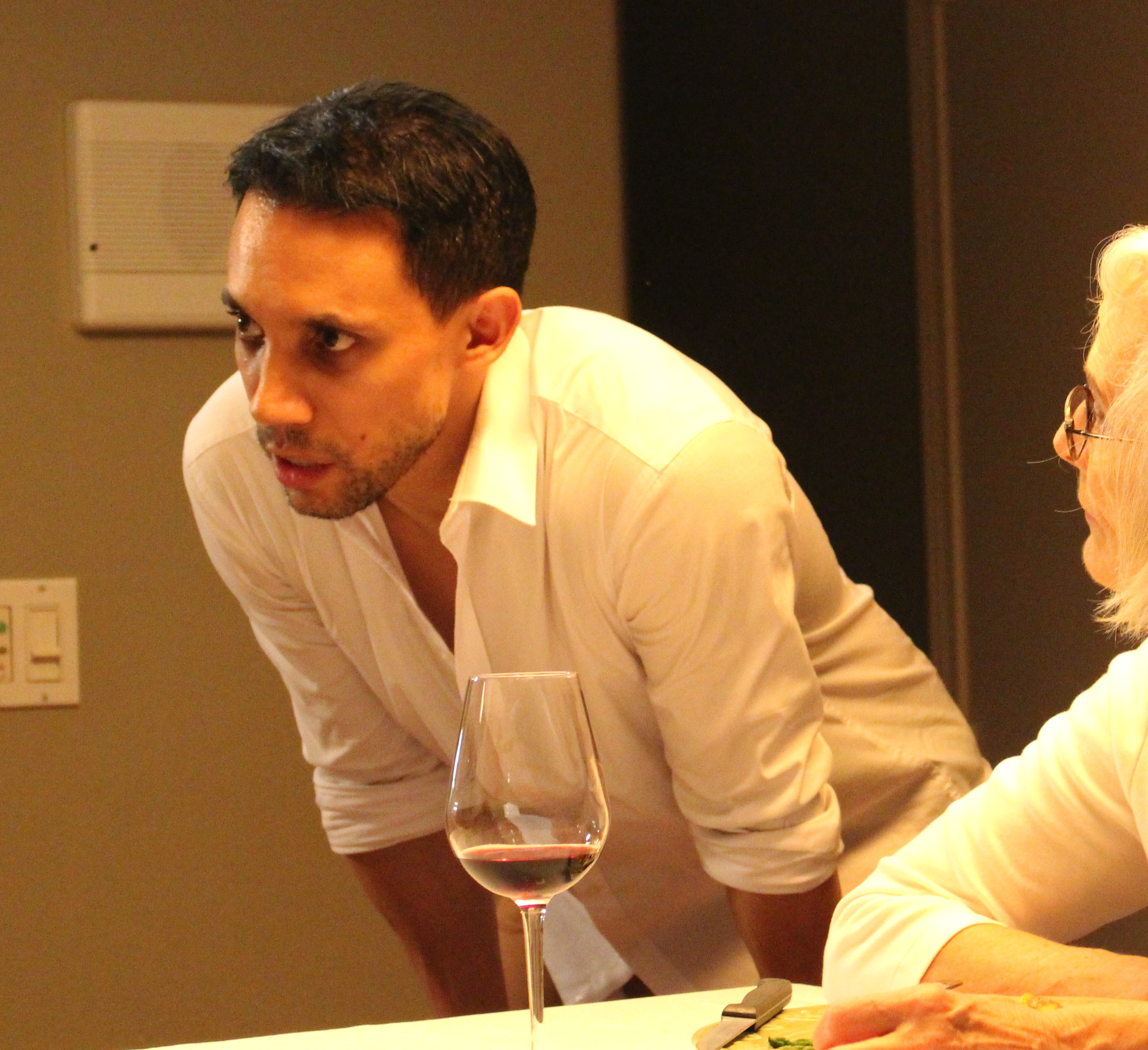
- Serafin on the set of The Believer
- Born: May 17, 1972 (age 54); Cincinnati, Ohio, U.S.
- Education: University of California, Los Angeles
- Occupations: Director; screenwriter; novelist
- Years active: 2009–present
- Spouse: Beth Morrow (m. 2008; div. 2013)

Shan Serafin (/ʃɔːn ˈsɛrəfɪn/ shawn SERR-ə-fin; born May 17, 1972) is an American film director, screenwriter, and novelist. In both film and literature he is known for his work in the thriller and action genres. For stage, the majority of his productions fall under drama.

== Writing career ==
Serafin has continually collaborated with best-selling novelist James Patterson, with whom he's co-authored The Women's War (2016), an action thriller about three female special ops; Come And Get Us (2017), a thriller about a young mother stranded in the desert; and Revenge (2017), a thriller about a hitman avenging his wife. In 2020, Patterson and Serafin collaborated for what would be their longest-running novel on the New York Times Best Seller List with Three Women Disappear (2020), which entwines the first-person accounts of three women suspected of the same murder. Serafin is known for fiction narratives featuring strong female characters often entangled in violent predicaments. His first novel Seventeen is the story of a seventeen-year old adolescent who gives herself seven days to live. His second solo-effort is Conquest, a fiction narrative of the toils of modern dating.

== Directing career ==
Serafin's film-directing career began with The Forest (2011), which was the first of three feature films he would write and direct. The Forest is a supernatural thriller shot on-location in the infamous Aokigahara Jukai suicide forest, which stars Aidan Bristow and Michael Madsen. His second film, Misfire (2013), starring Jaina Lee Ortiz, is a stylized action-thriller depicting rival female assassins converging on the same target. His most-recent film, The Believer (2017), is a psychological thriller involving demonology within the context of marital strife. The Believer represents his second collaboration with actor Aidan Bristow, who also produced, and co-stars Billy Zane, Sophie Kargman, Lindsey Ginter, and Susan Wilder.

Serafin's directorial work in theater began with a stage play he also co-wrote entitled The Essential Bond, a biographical narrative about the true story of two-time Nobel Prize winner Linus Pauling. The Essential Bond starred John Astin and Matt Ashford and ran for three months. Thereafter, Serafin directed several stage productions in Los Angeles, including Adam Rapp's Red Light Winter, Patrick Marber's Closer, and Theresa Rebeck's Spike Heels, before directing Faisons Retentir le Chant Merveilleux de Nos Vies at the Auditorium Edmond Michelet à La Cité Internationale des Arts in Paris.

== Personal life ==
Serafin trained in stage performance and filmmaking at UCLA and served as a member of the Aresis Ensemble Theater Troupe in Santa Monica where he engaged in the North American debut of several avant-garde French and other European works. He was married to Beth Morrow from 2008 until they divorced in 2013. Currently residing in both Paris and Los Angeles he is a Buddhist practicing with the Soka Gakkai International organization of Nichiren Buddhism practitioners, wherein he has undertaken responsibility as a national youth leader and served for a term as the editor-in-chief of its national youth gazette Seize the Day.

== Novels ==
- Seventeen (2004)
- The Women's War (2016)
- Come and Get Us (2017)
- Revenge (2017)
- Conquest (2017)
- Three Women Disappear (2020)

== Filmography ==
- Forest of the Living Dead (2011)
- Misfire (2012)
- The Believer (2021)
