= Grave Halloween =

- Written by: Ryan W. Smith; Sheldon Wilson
- Directed by: Steven R. Monroe
- Music by: Andrew Harris
- Country of origin: Canada
- Original language: English

Production
- Executive producers: Tom Berry; Paul Hertzberg; Lisa M. Hansen
- Producer: John Prince
- Cinematography: Michael C. Blundell
- Editor: Christopher A. Smith
- Running time: 89 minutes
- Production company: CineTel Films

Original release
- Network: Syfy
- Release: October 19, 2013

Grave Halloween (also known as The Suicide Forest and released in some markets as Deathly Halloween) is a 2013 Canadian TV horror film. An original production by CineTel Films for Syfy, it was directed by Steven R. Monroe and written by Ryan W. Smith and Sheldon Wilson. The film is set in Japan, but it was filmed in Canada.

== Plot ==
On October 31, a Japanese-born American student at a Japanese university, Maiko (Kaitlyn Leeb), risks her life to save the spirit of her dead mother. She travels into Aokigahara Forest to find her birth mother, who has recently committed suicide. Her friends Kyle, Terry, and Amber travel with her, in hopes of producing a documentary for a class project.

== Cast ==
- Kaitlyn Leeb as Maiko
  - Isabelle Beech as Young Maiko
- Cassi Thomson as Amber
- Graham Wardle as Kyle
- Dejan Loyola as Terry
- Jeffrey Ballard as Craig
- Hiro Kanagawa as Jin
- Jesse Wheeler as Brody
- Tom Stevens as Skylar
- Kevan Ohtsji as Policeman
- Hyuma Frankowski as Junior Policeman
- Maiko Miyauchi as Maiko's Mother
- Luna Kurokawa as Maiko's Sister
- Yukari Komatsu as Bracelet Woman

== Reception ==
Dave Wain, writing for British horror magazine Scream, gave Grave Halloween 1.5 stars out of five, calling the film "a real let-down". Guy Adams, reviewing the film for the British Fantasy Society, said the film was "nothing special but, in an increasingly dense forest of grotty cinematic deadwood, there is enough life in it to be worth your time".

== See also ==
- List of films set around Halloween
- The Forest
- Forest of the Living Dead
