= Hello Goodbye (2008 film) =

- Directed by: Graham Guit
- Written by: Graham Guit; Michael Lellouche
- Produced by: Fabio Conversi; Leon Edery; Moshe Edery; Francesco Pamphili
- Starring: Fanny Ardant; Gérard Depardieu
- Cinematography: Gérard Sterin
- Edited by: Marie-Blanche Colonna
- Distributed by: SND Films
- Release date: 2008
- Running time: 99 minutes
- Countries: France; Israel; Italy
- Languages: French; Hebrew

Hello Goodbye is a 2008 French language romantic-dramedy film directed by Graham Guit. The film stars Gérard Depardieu and Fanny Ardant.The film is set in both Israel and France and follows the life of a Jewish couple who try to discover their true identity, their roots and the meaning of being Jewish.

== Cast ==
- Fanny Ardant : Gisèle
- Gérard Depardieu : Alain Gaash
- Jean Benguigui : Simon Gash
- Manu Payet : Shapiro
- Gilles Gaston-Dreyfus : Siletsky
- Lior Ashkenazi : Yossi
- Sasson Gabai : Police chief
- Jean-Michel Lahmi : Saint-Alban
- Muriel Combeau : Mme Saint-Alban
- Clémentine Poidatz : Gladys
- Julien Baumgartner : Nicolas
- Françoise Christophe : Alain's mother
- Claudine Baschet : Grandmother
- Jean-François Elberg : Monsieur Sapin
- Alix de Konopka : Mme Gash
- Jean-Claude Jay : Alain's father
- Jacques Herlin : Uncle Albert
