= The Believer (2021 film) =

2021 horror film directed by Shan Serafin

- Official release poster
- Directed by: Shan Serafin
- Written by: Shan Serafin
- Produced by: Joshua Minyard; Aidan Bristow; Arthur Chtiyan; William Day Frank; Raul Gazteazoro; Sophie Kargman; Leo Livshetz
- Starring: Aidan Bristow; Sophie Kargman; Susan Wilder; Lindsey Ginter; Robbie Goldstein; Billy Zane
- Cinematography: John Nodorft
- Edited by: Matthew Rundell
- Music by: Kevin Lax; Jeff Toyne
- Production companies: Gypsy Lane Films; 611 Films; Relentless Escargot Productions
- Distributed by: Artist View Entertainment; Freestyle Releasing
- Release date: April 2, 2021
- Running time: 91 minutes
- Country: United States
- Language: English

The Believer is a 2021 American horror film written and directed by Shan Serafin. It stars Aidan Bristow, Sophie Kargman, Susan Wilder, Lindsay Ginter, Robbie Goldstein and Billy Zane. It runs for 91 minutes. The film is about a woman driven murderously insane by a mad doctor's strange alternative therapy.

== Plot ==
Lucas (Aidan Bristow), a once-prominent nuclear physicist, finds himself unemployed and grappling with the emotional aftermath of his wife Violet's (Sophie Kargman) sudden and unexplained termination of her pregnancy. This event creates a chasm in their marriage, leaving Lucas feeling betrayed and confused.

As Lucas attempts to navigate his job search and mend his strained relationship, he begins to experience alarming physical symptoms, persistent fatigue, unexplained weight loss, and hallucinations. Simultaneously, Violet's behavior becomes increasingly erratic, she exhibits mood swings, engages in cryptic rituals, and isolates herself in the attic for hours.

Concerned about his deteriorating health and Violet's mental state, Lucas seeks help from Dr. Benedict (Billy Zane), a therapist known for unconventional methods. Dr. Benedict suggests an alternative therapy involving immersive role-playing exercises designed to confront and overcome deep-seated fears. Lucas agrees, hoping to restore normalcy to his life.

However, the therapy sessions blur the lines between reality and delusion. Lucas begins to question his perceptions as he experiences vivid nightmares and encounters with mysterious figures. Violet's actions grow more sinister, she speaks in tongues, displays knowledge of events she couldn't possibly know, and hints at a malevolent presence influencing their lives.

The tension escalates when two enigmatic individuals visit their home, claiming to be Violet's parents. Their unsettling demeanor and cryptic conversations deepen Lucas's paranoia. He discovers hidden journals and artifacts suggesting Violet's involvement in occult practices aimed at summoning otherworldly entities.

As Lucas delves deeper into the mystery, he uncovers a chilling revelation: he may be the target of a ritual intended to serve a dark purpose. His attempts to escape are thwarted by a series of supernatural occurrences, trapping him in a nightmarish reality where trust is elusive, and his own mind becomes an unreliable ally.

Lucas confronts Violet during a ritualistic ceremony. The confrontation forces him to face his deepest fears and the possibility that his reality has been manipulated by forces beyond comprehension.

== Cast ==
- Aidan Bristow as Lucas
- Sophie Kargman as Violet
- Susan Wilder as Charlotte
- Lindsey Ginter as Gus
- Robbie Goldstein
- Billy Zane as Dr. Benedict

== Release ==
Freestyle Releasing releases The Believer On-Demand on April 2, 2021.

== Reception ==
Alex Saveliev of Film Threat gave it a five out of ten and he wrote:

While admirable in its ambition, the end result just doesn't quite gel. Cool poster, though.
