= Shut In (2016 film) =

- Theatrical release poster
- Directed by: Farren Blackburn
- Written by: Christina Hodson
- Produced by: Ariel Zeitoun; Claude Leger; Christine Haebler
- Starring: Naomi Watts; Oliver Platt; Charlie Heaton; Jacob Tremblay; David Cubitt; Clémentine Poidatz
- Cinematography: Yves Bélanger
- Edited by: Baxter; Maryline Monthieux
- Music by: Nathaniel Méchaly
- Production companies: Lava Bear Films; Transfilm International; Canal+; Ocs; Cine+
- Distributed by: EuropaCorp (United States and France); VVS Films (Canada)
- Release dates: November 11, 2016 (United States and Canada); November 30, 2016 (France)
- Running time: 91 minutes
- Countries: United States; France; Canada
- Language: English
- Budget: $10 million
- Box office: $13.1 million

Shut In is a 2016 psychological horror thriller film directed by Farren Blackburn, written by Christina Hodson, and starring Naomi Watts, Oliver Platt, Charlie Heaton, Jacob Tremblay, David Cubitt, and Clémentine Poidatz.

The film was released in the United States on November 11, 2016 by EuropaCorp.

== Plot ==
Stephen, a troubled teen from Maine, is sent to boarding school. While his father, Richard Portman, is driving him there, they start arguing. The car eventually swerves into oncoming traffic, killing Richard and putting Stephen into a persistent vegetative state.

Six months later, Richard's second wife and Stephen's stepmother, child psychologist Mary, is taking care of his every need. Mary works from home. She is upset to learn that one of her patients, a deaf-mute child named Tom, is to be transferred to a school in Boston. Later, Mary discusses Stephen with her therapist, Dr. Wilson. She feels guilty, but has decided to put Stephen in a home to be cared for.

She finds Tom asleep in her car. She brings him inside and makes a call, but Tom vanishes. The police conduct a fruitless search. Over the following nights, Mary wakes up to sounds in the house and even sees Tom in the darkness one night. She discusses these events with Wilson, who attributes it to parasomnia. Wilson wants to prescribe her medication and orders blood tests. Doug Hart, the father of one of her patients, asks her out, but Mary declines, implying that it would be unprofessional.

Mary reconsiders and has dinner with Doug. Later, Stephen is missing from his bed. While looking for him, Mary finds that a small door to a crawlspace is slightly ajar. While examining it, she is grabbed from inside by two small hands. The next morning, she wakes up on the floor. Stephen is back in his bed but has scratches on his face.

Mary declines two invitations to leave her isolated house before an impending ice storm, one from her assistant Lucy, and another from Doug. Wilson contacts her via Skype with her blood test results. He admonishes her because Stephen's medication is showing up in her blood. Mary denies taking any medication and walks away without ending the call. Wilson sees Stephen's empty wheelchair, then sees Stephen walk across the living room. The lights go out in the house and the computer connection drops.

Mary is in the basement when the lights go out. She sees Tom, and just then, Stephen appears and knocks her out. Mary regains consciousness—bound, gagged, and naked in the bathtub, with Stephen bathing her. He reveals how he woke up in the hospital after the accident with her there. He did not move or speak so that he could relish her attention. He believes that for six months they were happy together, but then Tom arrived.

It is revealed that Tom has been living in the crawlspace, rather than having been transferred to Boston. When Tom saw Stephen moving around, Stephen blocked him in the crawlspace, hoping that he would starve to death. Stephen has been keeping Mary disoriented by slipping her his medicine, which not only allows him to walk around at night, but also confuses her when she sees Tom. Stephen forces Mary to swallow another pill, then goes to deal with Tom. Alone in the tub, Mary uses a bottle of shampoo to both slip her bonds and induce vomiting to expel the pill. Wilson rushes to Mary's house, but wrecks his car en route. His attempt to call the police is unsuccessful due to the ice storm. Mary finds Stephen and Tom in the basement where Stephen is planning to murder Tom, and learns that Stephen killed Richard on purpose. Mary and Tom escape the basement and hide in a closet.

Wilson arrives to warn Mary, only to be attacked and stabbed by Stephen. Mary tries to leave and discovers Doug's body blocking the door. Wilson, before dying, advises Mary to play along with Stephen's delusion. Stephen has nailed all of the doors and windows shut to prevent them from escaping, Mary breaks a skylight and pulls Tom up to climb out. Mary plays along with Stephen's delusions until she can escape. Mary and Tom run to the lake, where Stephen attempts to drown Tom in the freezing water. Mary grabs the hammer Stephen dropped and hits him in the head, killing him. Days later, Mary and Tom go to the Child and Adoption center.

== Cast ==
- Naomi Watts as Mary Portman
- Oliver Platt as Dr. Bennett Wilson, Mary's friend
- Charlie Heaton as Stephen Portman, Mary's stepson
- David Cubitt as Doug Hart
- Jacob Tremblay as Tom Patterson, a deaf-mute child and Mary's patient
- Clémentine Poidatz as Lucy
- Crystal Balint as Grace Mitchell
- Alex Braunstein as Aaron Hart
- Peter Outerbridge as Richard Portman, Stephen's father
- Ellen David as Joan

== Production ==
On November 5, 2014, it was announced that EuropaCorp had set Farren Blackburn to direct Shut In, a psychological thriller based on the 2012 Black List script by Christina Hodson. EuropaCorp financed, distributed worldwide and co-produced the film with Lava Bear Films. Naomi Watts was set to play the lead role. On March 18, 2015, Oliver Platt, Charlie Heaton, David Cubitt, Jacob Tremblay, and Clementine Poidatz were added to the cast of the film.

== Release ==
In March 2015, EuropaCorp set the film for a February 19, 2016, release. On December 15, 2015, the release date was pushed back to June 17, 2016. In February 2016, the release date was pushed back again to September 9, 2016. In May 2016, the release date was pushed back again to November 11, 2016.

== Reception ==
=== Box office ===
Shut In grossed $6.9 million in the United States and Canada, and $6.2 million in other countries, for a worldwide total of $13.1 million, against a production budget of $10 million. Shut In was released alongside Arrival and Almost Christmas, and was expected to gross around $6 million from 2,058 theaters in its opening weekend. It ended up grossing $3.7 million, finishing seventh at the box office.

=== Critical response ===
On review aggregator website Rotten Tomatoes, the film has an approval rating of 5% based on 44 reviews, with an average rating of 2.92/10. The site's critical consensus reads, "Fatally undermined by a clichéd, confused plot and a total absence of thrills, Shut In wastes its talented cast—and viewers' time." On Metacritic, the film has a weighted average score 25 out of 100, based on 14 critics, indicating "generally unfavorable reviews". Audiences polled by CinemaScore gave the film an average grade of "C" on an A+ to F scale.

Rex Reed of The New York Observer gave the film 0/4 stars, saying that it was "A lunk-headed, badly written, indifferently acted, woodenly directed heap of spook-movie clichés", and added: "There isn't one genuine thrill in the whole thing. I’ve had bigger scares from my goldfish bowl." Richard James Havis of the South China Morning Post gave the film 1/5 stars, writing: "how Shut In managed to get a worldwide release presents a bigger mystery than its story, which, as is usual for the genre, puts a pretty woman in danger at the hands of a deranged male." Jeannette Catsoulis of The New York Times wrote: "In this achingly inept thriller, you will see Naomi Watts do what she can to sell a plot of such preposterousness that the derisory laughter around me began barely 20 minutes in." Kimber Myers of the Los Angeles Times wrote that the film "is more effective as a 90-minute commercial for the L.L. Bean aesthetic than as a pseudo-psychological thriller."

Zach Schevich of Time Out gave the film 2/5 stars and wrote: "As Mary loses sleep, her paranoia worsens, yet Christina Hodson's monotonous script fails to make Mary's psychological struggles feel any more severe than a case of misplaced keys." Peter Bradshaw of The Guardian was more positive, giving it a score of 3/5 stars and writing: "There is something entertainingly Hitchcockian and Freudian in this twisty chiller, with a touch of Dennis Potter somewhere in there, too. It's low-key and modestly budgeted, but perfectly well made, and Watts maintains a cool and steady presence."

=== Accolades ===
Watts received a Golden Raspberry Award nomination for Worst Actress, but lost to Rebekah Turner for Hillary's America: The Secret History of the Democratic Party.
