= Forest of the Living Dead =

- Directed by: Shan Serafin
- Written by: Shan Serafin
- Starring: Aidan Bristow; Johnny Young; Christina Myhr; Michael Madsen
- Cinematography: BT Jackson; Shijo Kingo
- Edited by: F. Ash Rainnes
- Production company: 611 Films
- Distributed by: Lightning Entertainment; Entertainment 7
- Release date: October 15, 2010 (Bel Air Film Festival)
- Running time: 98 minutes
- Country: United States
- Language: English
- Budget: $400,000

Forest of the Living Dead, also known outside of the United States as The Forest, is a 2010 American psychological horror film directed by American writer and director Shan Serafin and produced by 611 Films. It depicts the enacted vengeance of a jilted covergirl who supernaturally transforms into a demonic spirit when she kills herself in the famed suicide forest of Aokigahara, in Japan's Mount Fuji, enabling herself to wreak a violent revenge, one by one, upon those who helped her ex-boyfriend leave her.

== Cast ==
- Aidan Bristow as Jason
- Johnny Young as Koji
- Christina Myhr as Valerie
- Michael Madsen as Lieutenant Brandon Ross
- Lisa Cullen as Katana
- Kyle Lardner as Ariaana
- Mary Takeyama as Kaneko

== Production ==
Forest of the Living Dead was shot on-location in the United States, Japan, and Mexico. Budget estimates are under US$400,000 and box office records will be available in late 2011. The film stars Aidan Bristow, Johnny Young, Christina Myhr and veteran actor Michael Madsen. It is filmed in color, primarily on HD with some portions in film.

== Release ==
Forest of the Living Dead debuted as The Forest in a worldwide premiere at the Bel Air Film Festival, October 15, 2010. The commercial release in the United States was slated for April 14, 2011.

== See also ==
- The Forest (2016 film)
- Grave Halloween
