= Graham Guit =

French director and screenwriter

- Born: 3 May 1968 (age 58); Neuilly-sur-Seine
- Occupations: Director; Screenwriter

Graham Guit is a French director and screenwriter born on 3 May 1968 in Neuilly-sur-Seine, France.

== Filmography ==
- 1997 : Le ciel est à nous with Romane Bohringer, Melvil Poupaud and Élodie Bouchez
- 1998 : Les Kidnappeurs with Melvil Poupaud, Élodie Bouchez and Romain Duris
- 2003 : Le Pacte du silence with Gérard Depardieu, Élodie Bouchez and Carmen Maura
- 2008 : Hello Goodbye with Gérard Depardieu, Fanny Ardant and Manu Payet
