= Farren Blackburn =

British film director

Farren Blackburn is a British film and television director and screenwriter. His work includes Netflix's young adult love story, The Innocents, the French English-language psychological thriller Shut In starring Naomi Watts, Netflix and Marvel's Daredevil, Iron Fist and The Defenders.

== Early life ==
He attended Caythorpe Primary School, then the Sir William Robertson School in Welbourn. In Caythorpe, he lived on South Parade. In 1989, he went to the US to teach soccer over the summer. He studied for a degree in Sports Science at the West London Institute of Higher Education.

As a young man, he signed professionally for Cambridge United Football Club and represented England at the youth level. After being in London, he applied for a Career Development Loan and completed an MA in Film and TV at Bournemouth University.

He found his way onto the BBC Production Training Scheme, for which there were ten places a year, with around five thousand applicants. He had a film featured at the BBC Short Film Festival.

== Career ==
He directed The Fades, for which he received a BAFTA for best Drama Series. He also directed the Golden Globe nominated crime series Luther, the movie Hammer of the Gods, the BBC period drama The Musketeers and the Doctor Who episodes "The Rings of Akhaten" and the 2011 Christmas special "The Doctor, The Widow and the Wardrobe". He directed Naomi Watts in the French English-language psychological thriller Shut In (2016), based on Christina Hodson's Blacklist screenplay about a woman who discovers a shocking secret about her catatonic son. In June 2019, he announced via Twitter that he would direct 5 episodes of season 2 of A Discovery of Witches.

Previously, he was also a regular director of the BBC medical drama Holby City.

== Awards ==
He won a BAFTA for best Drama Series for The Fades.

== Family life ==
He is married to actress Verona Joseph and has two daughters and a son: Elsie-Mae Blackburn, Ruby-Rose Blackburn and Terrell Blackburn.

== Filmography ==
- The Fades (2011)
- Doctor Who
  - "The Doctor, the Widow and the Wardrobe" (2011, Christmas Special)
  - "The Rings of Akhaten" (2013, Series 7 Episode 8)
- Hammer of the Gods (2013)
- The Musketeers
  - "The Challenge" (2014)
  - "Musketeers Don't Die Easily" (2014)
- Daredevil (2015, season 1)
  - "World on Fire", Episode 5
  - "Nelson v. Murdock", Episode 10
- Shut In (2016)
- Iron Fist
  - "Felling Tree with Roots", Episode 7 (2017, season 1)
- The Defenders
  - "The Defenders", Episode 8 (2017, season 1)
- The Innocents (2018)
- A Discovery of Witches, Season 2 (TV Series) (2021)
