= 2016: Obama's America =

2012 American political documentary film

- Theatrical release poster
- Directed by: Dinesh D'Souza; John Sullivan
- Written by: Dinesh D'Souza; John Sullivan
- Based on: The Roots of Obama's Rage and Obama's America by Dinesh D'Souza
- Produced by: Gerald R. Molen; Ann Balog; Doug Sain
- Starring: Dinesh D'Souza
- Music by: Calvin Jones
- Production company: Obama's America Foundation
- Distributed by: Rocky Mountain Pictures
- Release date: July 13, 2012
- Running time: 89 minutes
- Country: United States
- Language: English
- Budget: $2.5 million
- Box office: $33.4 million

2016: Obama's America is a 2012 American right-wing conspiracy propaganda film written and directed by Dinesh D'Souza and John Sullivan. The film is based on D'Souza's books The Roots of Obama's Rage and Obama's America: Unmasking the American Dream, which are both, like the film, right-wing polemics against then-president Barack Obama. Through interviews and reenactments, the film compares the similarities of the lives of D'Souza and Obama, as D'Souza alleges that early influences on Obama were affecting his domestic policy decisions.

2016: Obama's America was released in the United States by Rocky Mountain Pictures on July 13, 2012, months before the 2012 United States presidential election, in which Obama was running for his second term. The film was received negatively by critics; reviewers described the film as politically partisan and as "a nonsensically unsubstantiated act of character assassination", unlikely to sway undecided voters or Obama supporters. Despite this, it grossed $33.4 million in the domestic box office against its $2.5 million budget.

== Summary ==
The documentary begins with D'Souza on screen describing his own personal experiences as an Indian immigrating to the United States, as a student at Dartmouth College, and then as an editor at the conservative magazine Policy Review, pointing out the similarities between his life and Barack Obama's. The film changes location to Indonesia, where a young Barack Obama is being reared by his mother Ann Dunham and stepfather Lolo Soetoro. A psychologist discusses the detrimental effect of an absentee father on his children. D'Souza travels to Africa and interviews Obama's half-brother George Obama.

As Obama's mother and stepfather's relationship becomes strained, Obama is sent to Hawaii to live with his grandparents and meets Frank Marshall Davis. Obama finishes his college studies at Columbia, where the film claims he is influenced by left-wing figures. His progression into an intellectual is highlighted by a visit to Kenya. The film incorporates spoken words from Obama's audio book, Dreams from My Father.

D'Souza discusses Obama's father, Barack Obama, Sr., and what D'Souza describes as Obama Sr.'s anti-colonialist views. This, according to D'Souza, explains why Obama rejects American exceptionalism and why D'Souza believes he is attempting to "reshape America." D'Souza delves into what he terms the "founding fathers" from Obama's past, including Frank Marshall Davis, Reverend Jeremiah Wright, Bill Ayers, Edward Said, and Roberto Unger. As a result, the film argues that Obama wants to significantly reduce the U.S.'s influence within the world while increasing the influence of nations that he believes have suffered or been held back economically or militarily due to the domination of the United States and other Western countries. To argue his case, D'Souza interviews Shelby Steele, Paul Vitz, Alice Dewey, Paul Kengor, Willy Kauai, George Obama, Philip Ochieng, Joseph Ojiru, Daniel Pipes, David Walker, and Sarah Obama (off-screen). The film warns that should Obama be elected to a second term, the ramifications will be far reaching. It ends by stating, "the future is in your hands."

== Development, production and promotion ==
Writer and director Dinesh D'Souza credited Michael Moore for giving him the idea on how to frame the film, stating: "When he released Fahrenheit 9/11 in 2004 ahead of the election, it sparked intense debate. I learned some lessons from Michael Moore, and hopefully he might learn some lessons from me about handling facts."

D'Souza describes the film as "a vista" of Barack Obama's earlier life, following his childhood from Hawaii to Indonesia and a visit to Kenya (Obama's father's birthplace). Such an upbringing, D'Souza contends, has caused Obama to subscribe "to an ideology that sees America very differently." D'Souza asserts that Obama's father's Kenyan roots in particular have inspired Obama "to shrink America's footprint in the world because he thinks we've been stepping on the world." The film further aims to show D'Souza's predictions about how the future of the United States might unfold should Obama be elected to a second term.

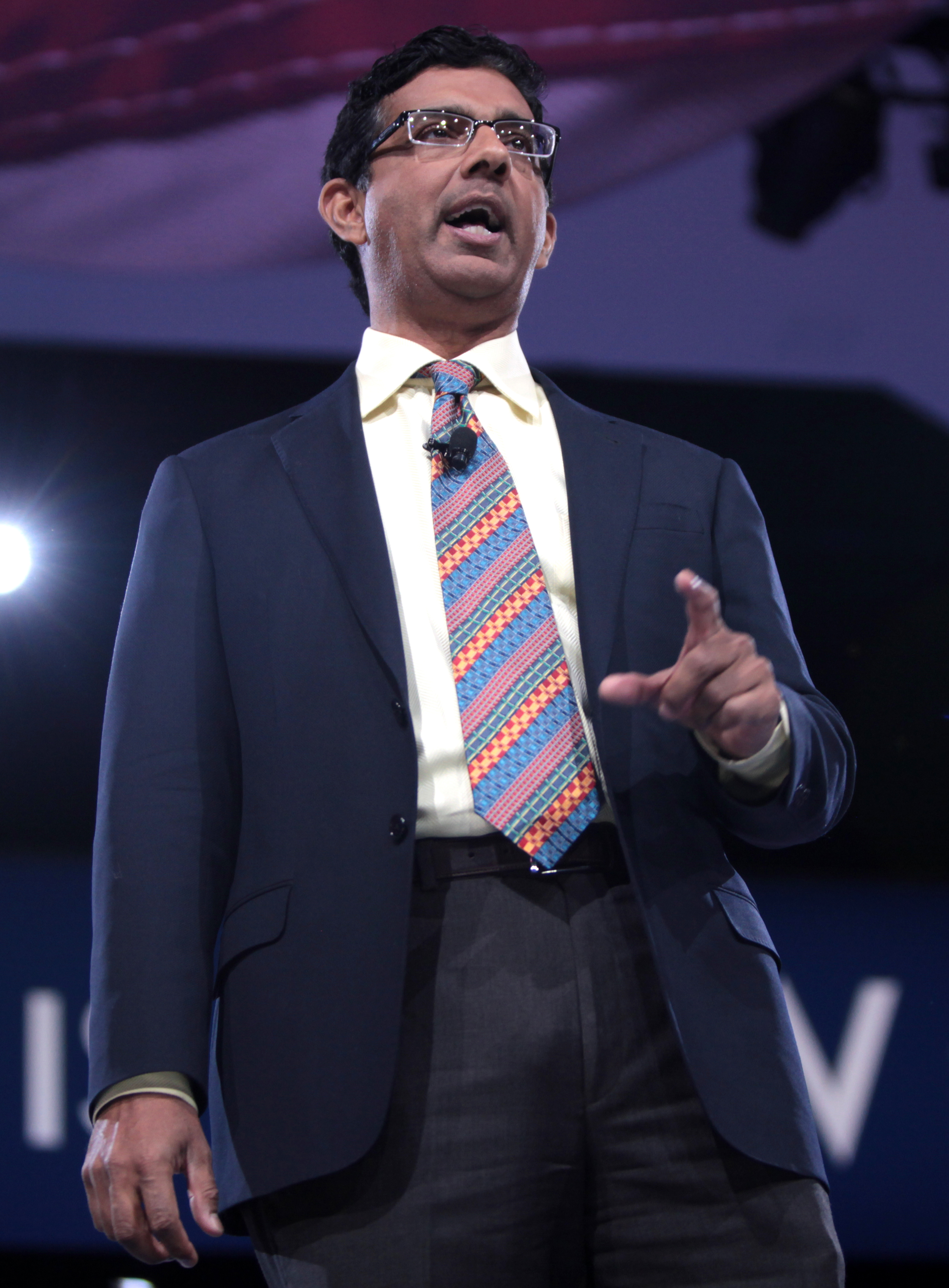
D'Souza (pictured) credited Michael Moore as an inspiration for how to frame the film.

The film is the first documentary by producer Gerald R. Molen, who said he became involved with the film because he personally finds the debt issue "terrifying", and believes that the movie illuminates how Obama's experiences before the presidency impact his political ideology. Molen is also "concerned about the plans for the disarmament of the U.S." and feels that "Israel has been thrown underneath the bus by this administration". The registered Republican considers himself a fiscally conservative independent, indicating that he has previously voted for Democrats in addition to Republicans, and priding himself on his evaluation of all the candidates.

D'Souza formed Obama's America Foundation (OAF) with Christopher Williams and Douglas Sain to raise funds for the film and oversee all business, marketing and production. The film was funded by about "two dozen donors"; and although it was released widely on August 24, 2012, 3 days before the 2012 National Republican Presidential Convention, it was not funded by the Republican Party.

The film contains seven re-enactments, for which 100 actors receive credits, including a shot where an actor's hand is shown "reverently dropping" dirt on the gravesite of Obama's father.

Promotion for the film included an effort to generate buzz through people the target audience "trust and admire," such as Glenn Beck and Rush Limbaugh. Later, an advertisement for the film was submitted to CNN, who requested that the filmmakers "explain why they believe the ad is not subject to political advertising disclosure requirements." The ad was not run because no explanation was received; however, the filmmakers submitted a different version of the ad which did run.

In October 2012, after Williams had attempted to sell shares of OAF jointly held by Sain to D'Souza, D'Souza filed suit to seek control of OAF. Sain filed a counter suit seeking to prevent D'Souza's unilateral seizure of OAF. The court rejected a motion for a restraining order, and per the OAF agreement sent the dispute to arbitration, stating the plaintiffs had "failed to make an adequate showing of irreparable harm to occur in such a way which cannot be later remedied." The dispute has not been settled or decided by the arbitration court.

== Release ==
=== Box office ===
2016: Obama's America opened in July 2012 on a single screen in Houston, Texas, grossing almost $32,000 during its first weekend. In August, the film was expanded to 169, then 1,091, theaters nationwide, following the limited release to 61 theaters over the previous month. ABC News declared the film to be a "box office hit." During its first wide opening weekend, August 24 through the 26th, the film earned an estimated $6.5 million. According to Box Office Mojo, the film grossed a total of $33.4 million domestically, making it – at the time of its release – the fifth highest domestic grossing documentary and the second highest domestic grossing political documentary in the United States since 1982.

The revenues saw a drop of 53% during the week prior to September 24, 2012, which the filmmakers attributed to a false rumor that circulated on the web indicating the film would be broadcast on FOX, as well as a pirated version which was posted on YouTube.

On October 16, the film was released on DVD.

Bloomberg Businessweek reported that the financial success of the film had "raised expectations for a flood of reactionary, election-season movies" to be released for "a vast, conservative-minded bloc of moviegoers, whom producers, filmmakers, and studios are racing to reach before they stream into voting booths on Nov. 6."

=== Critical response ===
On the review aggregator website Rotten Tomatoes, 26% of 34 critics' reviews are positive, with an average rating of 4.12/10. Metacritic, which uses a weighted average, assigned the film a score of 26 out of 100, based on 14 critics, indicating "generally unfavorable" reviews.

Owen Gleiberman of Entertainment Weekly gave the film a grade of F, calling it "A nonsensically unsubstantiated act of character assassination ... In place of an actual documentary, D'Souza employs 'pseudo-scholarly leaps of logic' to invent an imaginary character who has inherited 'anti-colonial,' 'Third World' views from his father—whom he last saw when he was 10 years old. The first third of the movie is dedicated to D'Souza's own life story, baselessly claiming his supposedly similar background gives him a special insight into the President's thinking. The facts show that 2016: Obama's America is nothing more than an insidious attempt to dishonestly smear the President by giving intellectual cover to the worst in subterranean conspiracy theories and false, partisan attacks."

Joe Leydon of Variety said "The deft editing and overall technical polish – as well as a generous travel budget – go a long way toward making the pic an attention-grabber" but that "the pic comes off as a cavalcade of conspiracy theories, psycho-politico conjectures and incendiary labeling," making it "highly unlikely that anyone predisposed to championing Obama would be won over". He also stated, "there's no gainsaying the value of '2016' as a sort of Cliffs Notes precis of the conservative case against the re-election of our current U.S. president." Ben Mankiewicz stated, "I think [the film] is another reminder of how many people in this country find Obama so shockingly unlikesome that they are seemingly ready to believe the most nonsensical theories about him."

John Fund of National Review wrote that "D'Souza obviously wants his film to be taken seriously, and it deserves to be." He praised the production and feels that the film will appeal to conservatives as well as independents who are unsure of Obama.

In The New York Times, Andy Webster labeled the film "strident" and said "D'Souza stumbles when interviewing George Obama, the president's half-brother, an activist who voluntarily lives amid squalor in Nairobi, Kenya" by trying to suggest that Barack Obama has not provided any help for his brother. Beth Fouhy of the Associated Press questioned some of the film's points and said its central thesis that Obama's presidency is an expression of his father's political beliefs, "is almost entirely subjective and a logical stretch at best". In The Washington Post, Michael O'Sullivan described the movie as a "slick infomercial ... destined to irritate the president's supporters while mobilizing his detractors, even as it is doomed to win precious few converts", while also criticizing D'Souza for "fear-mongering of the worst kind". Bill Goodykoontz of The Arizona Republic said it was "preaching to the choir" in a style similar to Michael Moore's films, but without the humor, straw men, and views from the other side.
