= Lava Bear Films =

Film production company

- Founded: 2011; 15 years ago
- Founder: David Linde
- Headquarters: Los Angeles, California, U.S.

Lava Bear Films is a production and film financing company producing three to five projects annually that are specifically designed for the global marketplace. The company was founded in 2011 by David Linde who was CEO until October 2015. Lava Bear's development slate is overseen by Tory Metzger, president and partner of Lava Bear, with Linde's support.

The company's creative partners include David S. Goyer, David Michôd, Guillermo del Toro, Shawn Levy, Denis Villeneuve, Zhang Yimou, and Alfonso and Jonás Cuarón, among others.

With Reliance Entertainment as its primary equity investor, Lava Bear also maintains a network of direct output partnerships in several territories around the globe with the following companies serving to complete its worldwide distribution and financing platform:

== Films in development and production ==
In November 2013, Jason Zada was signed by Lava Bear and David S. Goyer to helm the Goyer-produced film The Forest starring Natalie Dormer and Michael Huisman. Focus Features picked up the North American distribution rights to the film, which acts as Zada's feature film directorial debut and was released on January 8, 2016. Lava Bear is also produced Shut In with EuropaCorp distributing worldwide and starring Naomi Watts; and on director Sammo Hung’s The Bodyguard starring Sammo Hung and Chinese superstar Andy Lau. Lava Bear is also a producer, with 21 Laps and FilmNation, on Denis Villeneuve's Arrival, starring Amy Adams, Jeremy Renner and Forest Whitaker and distributed domestically by Paramount Pictures. The company, with Esperanto Kino and Itaca Films, premiered Jonás Cuarón’s Desierto as a Special Presentation at the 2016 Toronto International Film Festival.
