= Stephen Petranek =

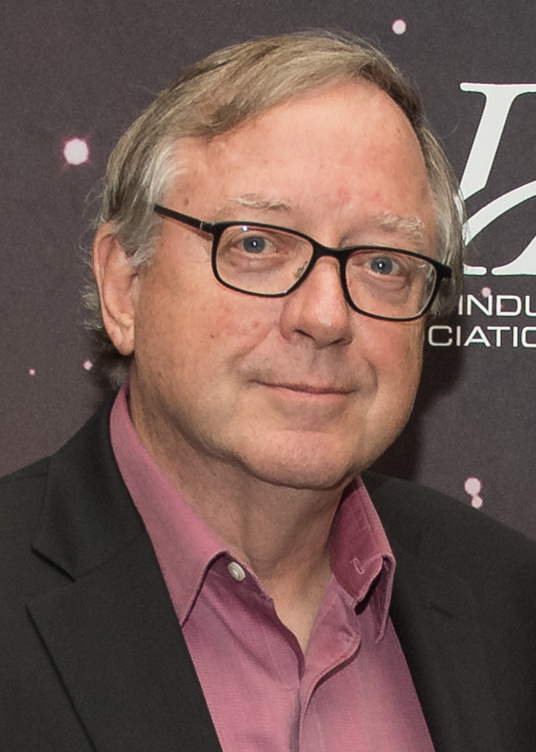
- Occupations: Writer; Editor

Stephen Petranek is an American writer, and editor of Breakthrough Technology Alert. He has previously edited Discover, and The Washington Post's magazine. He was the founding editor and editor in chief of This Old House magazine for Time Inc., and was senior editor for science at Life magazine.

He is co-founder and President of Arc Programs. He also writes for the Daily Reckoning.

Petranek spoke at the TED conference in 2002, and again in 2016.

His book How We'll Live on Mars was published in 2015.

== Education ==
Petranek attended the University of Maryland College Park, receiving a BS, Business Administration. He served as editor-in-chief of the award-winning college newspaper, the Diamondback.

== Works ==
- How We'll Live on Mars. Simon & Schuster/TED. 2015. ISBN 978-1476784762.
