= Rebekah Turner =

American actress

- Occupation: Actress
- Known for: Golden Raspberry Award for Worst Actress recipient

Rebekah Turner (also known as Becky Turner) is an American actress. She is known for receiving the 2016 Golden Raspberry Award for Worst Actress for her role as Hillary Clinton in the 2016 film Hillary's America: The Secret History of the Democratic Party.

== Biography ==
Turner is from Fort Worth, Texas and is a lifelong stage actress. Her appearances on screen have included the 2012 revival of Dallas and the Reelz crime documentary series Murder Made Me Famous.

Turner's role in Hillary's America was brief, with no lines, and she did not even show her face. The Golden Raspberry Awards announcement video did not mention Turner by name, instead crediting "The 'Actress' Who Played Hillary Clinton". Some sources have interpreted this as Turner sharing the award with Mikaela Krantz, who played a younger version of Clinton in the film, but only Turner appeared on the official list of nominees.

== Awards ==
Year	Category	Nominated work	Result	Ref.
2016	Golden Raspberry Award for Worst Actress	Hillary's America: The Secret History of the Democratic Party	Won	
