= Gerald R. Molen =

American film producer

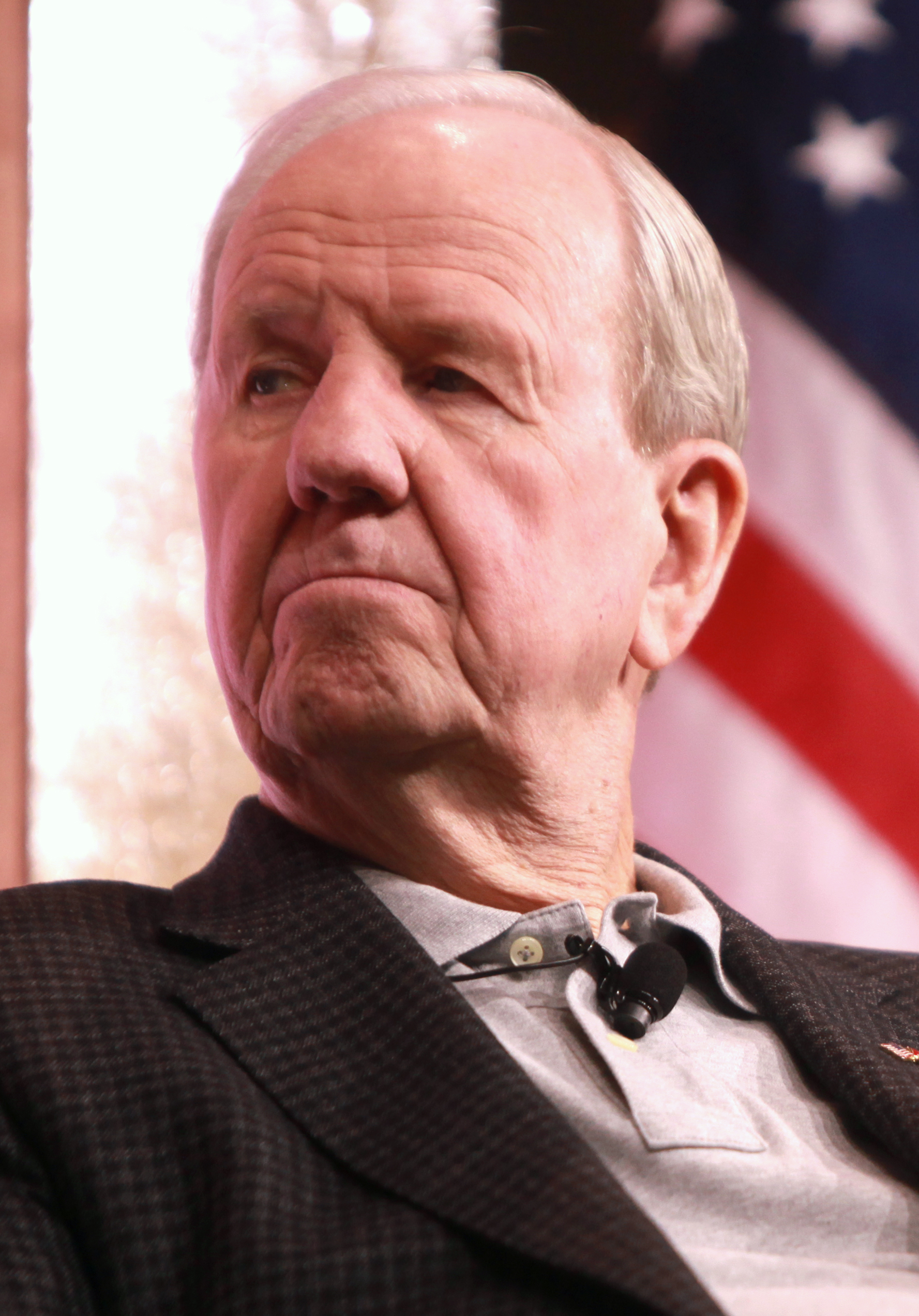
- Molen in 2014
- Born: Gerald Robert Molen; January 6, 1935 (age 91); Great Falls, Montana, U.S.
- Occupation: Film producer
- Years active: 1974–present
- Notable work: Jurassic Park; Schindler's List
- Political party: Republican
- Awards: Academy Award for Best Picture

Gerald Robert "Jerry" Molen (born January 6, 1935) is an American film producer. He is best known for producing films for Steven Spielberg and Amblin Entertainment, including Hook (1991), Jurassic Park (1993), and The Lost World: Jurassic Park (1997). Molen won the Academy Award for Best Picture for producing Schindler's List (1993), which is widely considered one of the greatest films ever made.

== Early life ==
Molen was born in Great Falls, Montana, the son of Edith Lorraine (née Meyer) and Gerald Richard Molen. He grew up in North Hollywood, California, after moving from Montana, with a number of younger brothers and sisters. His mother ran a diner, "The Blue Onion", which was located across from one of the major studios.

== Career ==
Molen has appeared in supporting roles or cameos in several of the films he has produced, including Rain Man (1988) and Days of Thunder (1990). He co-produced Jurassic Park (1993), in which he played Dr. Harding.

Molen produced 2016: Obama's America, a documentary critical of American President Barack Obama, during the 2012 presidential campaign. He also produced a later follow-up, Hillary's America: The Secret History of the Democratic Party, a 2016 documentary that was heavily panned, winning four of the five Golden Raspberry Awards for which it was nominated, including Worst Picture, the first documentary to do so.

In 2016, in response to accusations of discrimination in Hollywood and the threat of an Academy Awards boycott, Molen argued that racism in the film industry was not a matter of concern. "There is no racism except for those who create an issue,” he said. “That is the worst kind. Using such an ugly way of complaining.”

In 2019, Movicorp announced that Molen would be producing the Southern Gothic romantic thriller limited series Sweet By and By, which he began preparations for in 2021.

== Personal life ==
Molen is an active member of the Church of Jesus Christ of Latter-day Saints and a conservative. He is now semi-retired, splitting his time between his native Montana and Las Vegas, Nevada.

== Filmography ==
- Absence of Malice (1981) (transportation coordinator)
- Tootsie (1982) (unit production manager)
- A Soldier's Story (1984) (unit production manager)
- The Color Purple (1985) (unit production manager)
- *batteries not included (1987) (associate producer)
- Rain Man (1988) (co-producer, unit production manager, actor)
- Days of Thunder (1990) (executive producer, actor)
- Hook (1991) (producer)
- Jurassic Park (1993) (producer, actor)
- Schindler's List (1993) (producer)
- The Flintstones (1994) (executive producer)
- The Little Rascals (1994) (producer)
- Casper (1995) (executive producer)
- The Trigger Effect (1996) (executive producer)
- Twister (1996) (executive producer)
- Amistad (1997) (actor)
- The Lost World: Jurassic Park (1997) (producer)
- The Other Side of Heaven (2001) (producer, actor)
- Catch Me If You Can (2002) (actor)
- Minority Report (2002) (producer)
- The Legend of Johnny Lingo (2003) (producer)
- Beyond the Blackboard (2011) (executive producer)
- 2016: Obama's America (2012) (producer)
- America: Imagine the World Without Her (2014) (producer)
- The Abolitionists (2016) (producer)
- Hillary's America: The Secret History of the Democratic Party (2016) (producer)
- The Meg (2018) (executive producer)
- Death of a Nation (2018) (producer)
- The Movies That Made Us (2021) (1 episode; participant)
