= Vindicating Trump =

- Theatrical release poster
- Directed by: Dinesh D'Souza
- Written by: Dinesh D'Souza; Debbie D'Souza; Bruce Schooley
- Produced by: Dinesh D'Souza; Bruce Schooley
- Starring: Dinesh D'Souza; Donald Trump
- Cinematography: Dan Parsons
- Music by: Bryan E. Miller
- Distributed by: SDG Releasing
- Release date: September 27, 2024
- Running time: 96 minutes
- Country: United States
- Language: English

Vindicating Trump is a 2024 political film about President Donald Trump, making its case for why he should be elected again. It was produced and directed by right-wing activist, filmmaker and conspiracy theorist Dinesh D'Souza, and Bruce Schooley. The film concerns the travails of former president Donald Trump, such as legal battles, the media, his actions on 6 January and assassination attempts, and falsely alleges voter fraud in the 2020 election and promotes debunked conspiracy theories that the left is behind an effort to assassinate Trump.

An accompanying book was released 8 October 2024.

== Cast ==
- Dinesh D'Souza
- Siaka Massaquoi
- Donald Trump
- Alina Habba
- Nick Searcy
- Lara Trump
