= King's College (New York City) =

Christian liberal arts college

The King's College
- Arms of The King's College
- Type: Private liberal arts college
- Active: 1938–2025
- Accreditation: None
- Religious affiliation: Non-denominational Christian
- President: Steven French
- Provost: Henry Bleattler
- Location: New York City, New York, U.S. 40°42′24″N 74°0′44″W
- Campus: Urban
- Colors: Blue and white
- Nickname: Lions
- Sporting affiliations: USCAA; HVIAC
- Mascot: Lion
- Website: tkc.edu

The King's College (TKC or simply King's) was a private non-denominational Christian liberal arts college in New York City. It was founded in 1938 in Belmar, New Jersey, by Percy Crawford. The college re-located to the state of Delaware in 1941 and then to Briarcliff Manor, New York in 1955. Following its loss of accreditation in December 1993, the college closed in 1994.

After being acquired by Campus Crusade for Christ and acquiring Northeastern Bible College, the college reopened in Manhattan in 1999. The college became independent of Campus Crusade in 2012. During and after the COVID-19 pandemic, the college faced financial challenges. The Middle States Commission on Higher Education withdrew accreditation from The King's College on August 31, 2023. The college did not open for the fall 2023 semester, but its leaders did not intend for its closure to be permanent. As of January 2024, the college was not accepting applications for admissions.

In January 2025, the trustees were seeking "to gift the college, including its charter and intellectual property … to likeminded evangelical Christians who propose the most compelling vision to resume the operations of the college". However, on July 14, 2025, they announced the institution would remain closed permanently and began the process of dissolution.

== History ==
=== Early years ===
Percy B. Crawford founded The King's College in 1938 in Belmar, New Jersey. The school re-located in 1941 to a Lexington mansion on the 65-acre former estate of Major Philip Reybold near Delaware City, Delaware, and again in 1955 to the former Briarcliff Lodge site in Briarcliff Manor, New York. At Briarcliff, The King's College sponsored the King's Tournament, a sports tournament in which East Coast Christian college athletes competed each year.

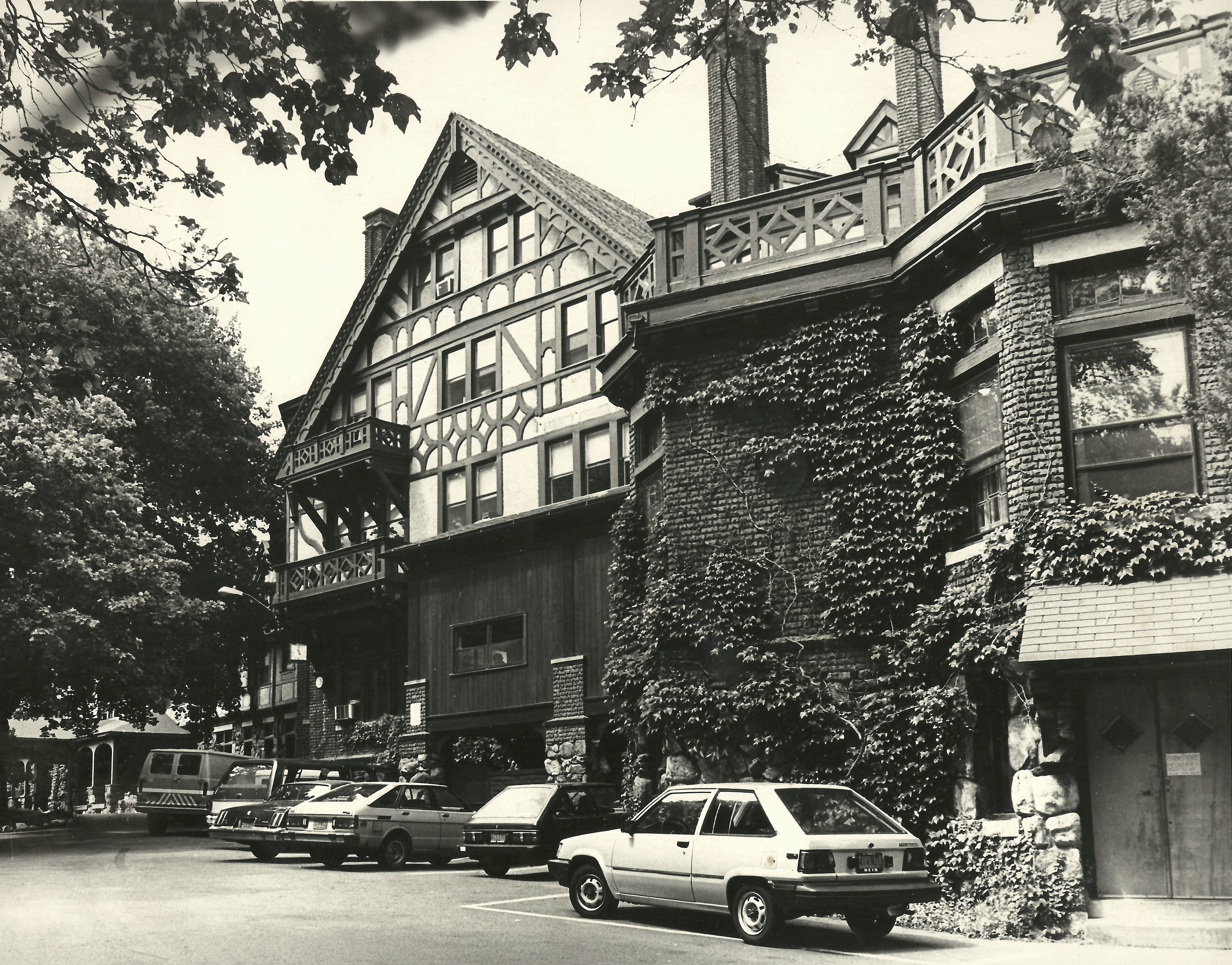
The Briarcliff Lodge, the main facility of the school's former Briarcliff Manor campus, c. 1980s

After Crawford's death, Robert A. Cook became the college's second president in 1962. The college prospered under his leadership, with enrollment growing to a high of 870 students in 1980. After 23 years as president, Cook retired and became the college's chancellor in 1985, a position which he held until his death in 1991. Friedhelm Radandt succeeded Cook to become the college's third president. Nine years later, in December 1994, the New York Commissioner of Education ordered the college to shut down after the Middle States Association of Colleges and Schools revoked the school's accreditation. By 1994, the college had experienced years of declining enrollment, financial troubles, and the deterioration of the Briarcliff campus. The college had purchased property for a new campus at Sterling Forest, but was prevented from selling the Briarcliff campus in a timely fashion. The college declared bankruptcy, owing more than $25 million to its creditors, mostly from the mortgage on the new campus.

=== Reestablishment in New York City ===
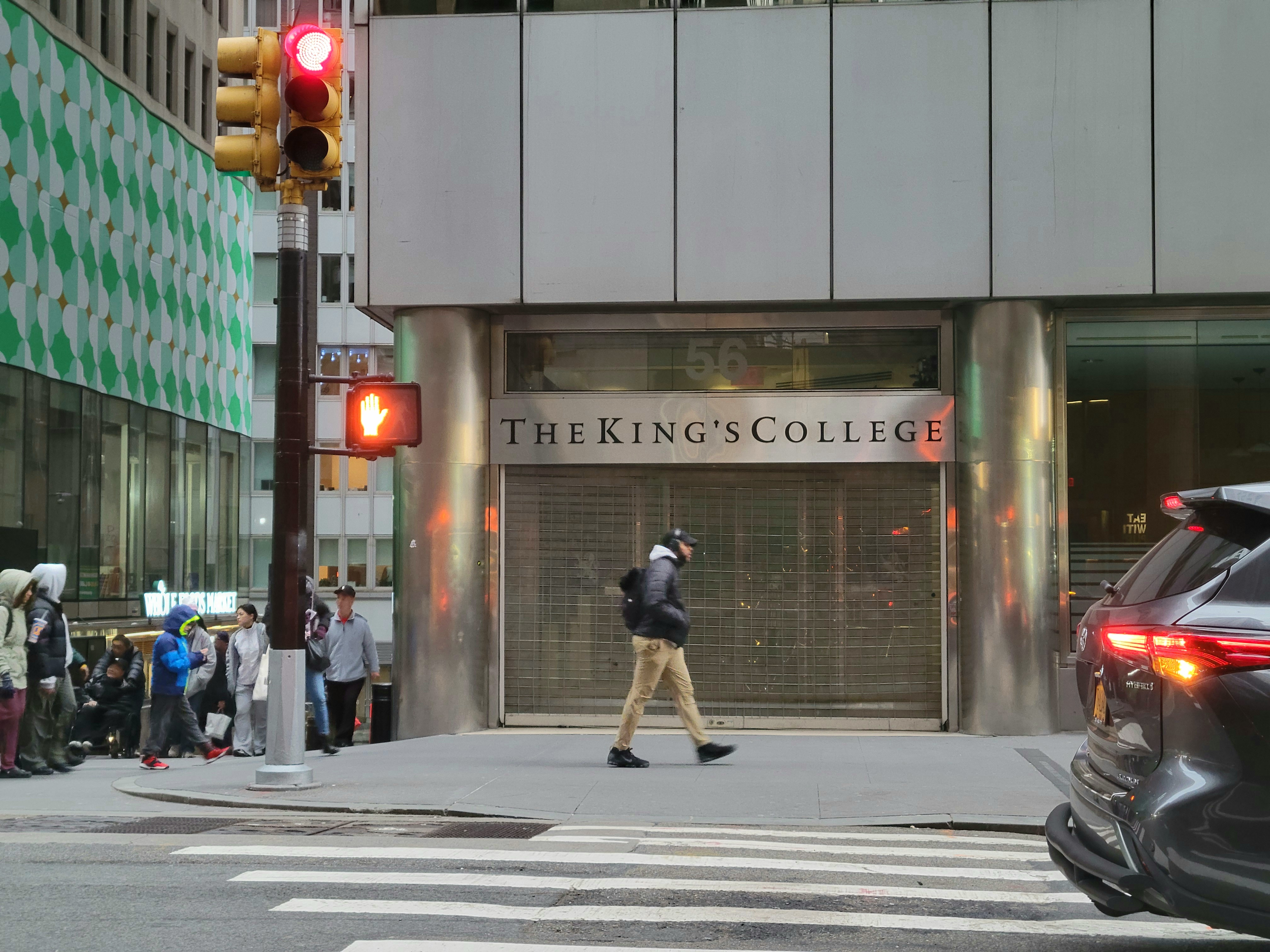
The King's College, New York City

The college charter first granted by the New York Board of Regents in 1955 remained in force. In 1997, the college's charter was amended to make Campus Crusade for Christ the sole member of the corporation. Together with Campus Crusade founder Bill Bright, J. Stanley "Stan" Oakes, then the director of Faculty Commons, a Campus Crusade ministry, began work to pay off the institution's debts and re-establish it in New York City. Instrumental in this process was the acquisition of Northeastern Bible College, which had experienced a decline and closure similar to that of King's. In 1999, King's leased 45,000 square feet (4,200 m^{2}) of space on three floors of the Empire State Building in New York City for classrooms, a student recreation center, and administrative offices, and the college re-opened. Radandt remained president, with Oakes as chairman. In January 2003, Oakes became the fourth president. Five years later, Oakes became chancellor and board member Andy Mills served as interim president.

Beginning in 2009, the college was accredited by the Middle States Commission on Higher Education. Accreditation was reaffirmed in 2015.

Following treatment for brain cancer, Oakes reassumed the presidency on January 1, 2009, although by December 2009, Andy Mills was again serving as interim president.

On August 23, 2010, the college announced the appointment of the conservative Christian writer Dinesh D'Souza as its new president. This proved to be a turbulent time for the college as much of the faculty did not agree with D'Souza's far-right media associations. On October 18, 2012, D'Souza resigned his post at the school shortly after it became known that he booked a room at a hotel with a woman who was not his wife. D'Souza claimed to be engaged to be married despite the fact that he was still married to his estranged wife. While a search committee was formed to select a permanent president, Andy Mills filled in for a third time.

In 2012, the college relocated from the Empire State Building to a new location one block south of Wall Street on Broadway. The college also became independent of Campus Crusade in 2012.

On July 11, 2013, the college announced the appointment of Gregory Alan Thornbury, former dean of the School of Theology and Missions at Union University, as the sixth president of the institution.

On November 21, 2017, the college announced that Thornbury would become its chancellor and retired Air Force Brigadier General Tim Gibson would serve as interim president. In June 2018, the college purchased a former hotel in the Financial District to become a student residence. Gibson was formally appointed the seventh president of King's on August 21, 2018. Gibson resigned in August 2022. Stockwell Day, former finance minister for the Canadian province of Alberta, was appointed as the interim president. On May 8, 2023, Steven French was appointed interim president.

=== 2023 financial struggles, loss of accreditation, closure and dissolution ===
In February 2023, the college's accreditor, the Middle States Commission on Higher Education (MSCHE) sought additional information regarding its "teach-out plan". In March 2023, the MSCHE placed the college on "show cause" status after rejecting its plan. This action required the college to demonstrate its compliance with MSCHE standards by April 18, 2023, or face the loss of its accreditation.

In March 2023, King's began notifying students that it might soon close due to financial difficulties. An emergency loan extended the school's operations through the end of the spring 2023 semester. Students living in apartments arranged by the college received eviction notices due to rent non-payment by the college to the landlords. King's pursued negotiations with seven other colleges to create preferred transfer agreements.

On May 26, 2023, the MSCHE withdrew its accreditation of The King's College; the withdrawal of accreditation was made effective as of August 31, 2023. The college appealed this decision on June 12, 2023. One week later, the college announced that it would not hold classes in the fall of 2023 and reduced the number of faculty and staff positions. The college also noted that it did not intend for the closure to be permanent. On July 27, 2023, the MSCHE noted that it considered King's to be closed and that the closure of the college terminated the college's June 12 appeal.

The college's financial challenges were documented in the 2023 Demise of the Crown podcast, produced by the Empire State Tribune, the King's student-led news outlet.

In 2023 the New York State Education Department listed King's as a "potential closure" and noted that since July 2023, the college had not had any students. In January 2025, King's announced that they were hoping to have a go-forward plan determined by July 15 and that they expected to be debt free by the end of the year. The King's College was required to dissolve or present a go-forward plan to the New York State Education Department by July 15, 2025. On July 14, 2025, trustees announced that the institution would remain closed permanently and begin the process of dissolution.

== Presidents ==
- Percy B. Crawford (1938–1962)
- Robert A. Cook (1962–1985)
- Friedhelm Radandt (1985–2002)
- J. Stanley Oakes (2003–2009)
- Andy Mills (interim) (2009–2010)
- Dinesh D'Souza (2010–2012)
- Gregory Alan Thornbury (2013–2017)
- Tim Gibson (2017–2022)
- Stockwell Day (2022–2023)
- Steve French (2023–2025)

== Notable faculty ==
- Anthony Bradley, research fellow at the Acton Institute
- Peter Kreeft, philosopher, theologian, and author

== See also ==
- List of defunct colleges and universities in New York
