= Trump Card (2020 film) =

Film by Dinesh D'Souza

- Theatrical release poster
- Directed by: Dinesh D'Souza; Debbie D'Souza; Bruce Schooley
- Written by: Dinesh D'Souza; Debbie D'Souza; Bruce Schooley
- Based on: The United States of Socialism by Dinesh D'Souza
- Produced by: Dinesh D'Souza
- Starring: Dinesh D'Souza
- Narrated by: Dinesh D'Souza
- Edited by: Harvey Cohen
- Music by: Bryan E. Miller
- Production company: D'Souza Media
- Distributed by: Cloudburst Entertainment
- Release date: October 9, 2020
- Running time: 106 minutes
- Country: United States
- Language: English

Trump Card is a 2020 American right-wing conspiracy propaganda film produced, co-written, and co-directed by right-wing political commentator and filmmaker Dinesh D'Souza. The film focuses on "the corruption and gangsterization of socialism in the Democratic Party as embodied by the two remaining presidential candidates, Bernie Sanders and Joe Biden." It was originally scheduled to be theatrically released on August 7, 2020, but was later delayed to a digital distribution on October 9, 2020.

== Premise ==
D'Souza described the film as "an exposé of the socialism, corruption and gangsterization that D'Souza attempts to attribute to the Democratic Party. Whether it is the creeping socialism of Joe Biden or the overt socialism of Bernie Sanders, the film reveals what is unique about modern socialism, who is behind it, why he says it's evil, and how we can work together with President Trump to stop it."

== Release ==
The film was initially set to be released by Cloudburst Entertainment in the United States on August 7, 2020, two weeks before the 2020 Republican National Convention. It was later delayed due to the ongoing COVID-19 pandemic keeping most domestic theaters closed, and was rescheduled for a digital release sometime in September. D'Souza later announced the film would be made available via DVD and video-on-demand on October 9, 2020.

== Reception ==
=== VOD rentals ===
In its debut weekend, Trump Card was the top-rented film on Apple TV and Google Play and second on FandangoNow. In its second weekend, it remained first at Google Play, while finishing second at Apple TV and third on Fandango. By its third week it placed fifth at Fandango, second at GooglePlay, and eighth at Apple TV.

=== Critical response ===
Writing for The A.V. Club, Vadim Rizov gave the film a grade of "F", saying: "By this point, D'Souza is unconvincingly frothing on the soundtrack about how 'the socialist left and the Democrats want to make us grovel' and 'make us worms,' but the whole premise is, predictably, a radical, cynical misunderstanding of Orwell." Mike McGranaghan of The Aisle Seat gave the film one out of four stars and wrote: "D'Souza is merely preaching to the choir. Any possibility of convincing moderate or liberal viewers is pretty much zero, thanks to unreliable commentators and manipulation of basic facts."

== Hunter Biden controversy ==
A centerpiece of the film is the promotion of theories involving Joe Biden's son, Hunter, and the idea that he was involved in illegal activity while his father was Vice President. One example is when D'Souza describes the idea of impropriety in regard to a supposed payment of $3.5 million to Hunter Biden from the wife of the mayor of Moscow. This accusation, referenced repeatedly by Donald Trump in the first 2020 presidential election debate, has not been substantiated.

The accusation of impropriety with Moscow, before the release of Trump Card, came to prominence through an investigation of the Biden family by Senate Republicans. Though the Senate report argued a possibility of criminal activity, and was attacked as politically motivated and flawed by figures including Mitt Romney, no concrete criminal evidence manifested against Hunter Biden or his father.
