= Faculty commons =

Faculty commons may refer to:

- A common room for academic faculty at an educational institution.
- The Senior Common Room of a British university.
- Faculty Commons, the faculty ministry of Cru.
