= America: Imagine the World Without Her =

2014 film by Dinesh D'Souza

- Theatrical release poster
- Directed by: Dinesh D'Souza; John Sullivan
- Written by: Dinesh D'Souza; John Sullivan; Bruce Schooley
- Based on: America: Imagine the World Without Her by Dinesh D'Souza
- Produced by: Dinesh D'Souza; Gerald R. Molen
- Starring: Dinesh D'Souza
- Cinematography: Benjamin Huddleston
- Edited by: Rickie Lee; Jeffrey Linford
- Music by: Bryan E. Miller
- Distributed by: Lionsgate
- Release date: June 27, 2014
- Running time: 103 minutes
- Country: United States
- Language: English
- Budget: $5 million
- Box office: $14.4 million

America: Imagine the World Without Her is a 2014 American political propaganda film by right-wing political conspiracy theorist Dinesh D'Souza based on his book of the same name. It is a follow-up to his film 2016: Obama's America (2012). In the film, D'Souza contends that parts of United States history are improperly and negatively highlighted by liberals, which he seeks to counter with positive highlights. Topics addressed include conquest of Indigenous and Mexican lands, slavery, and matters relating to foreign policy and capitalism. D'Souza collaborated with John Sullivan and Bruce Schooley to adapt his book of the same name into a screenplay. D'Souza produced the film with Gerald R. Molen and directed it with Sullivan. The film combined historical reenactments with interviews with different political figures.

America: Imagine the World Without Her was marketed to political conservatives and through Christian marketing firms. Lionsgate released the film in three theaters on June 27, 2014 and expanded its distribution on the weekend of the U.S. holiday Independence Day on July 4, 2014. The film grossed $14.4 million, which made it the highest-grossing documentary in the United States in 2014, though D'Souza's previous documentary 2016: Obama's America had grossed over $33 million. Most professional film critics called the film poorly-made and partisan. Political commentators analyzed D'Souza's rebuttal of Howard Zinn's criticisms, the filmmaker's treatment of Saul Alinsky, Barack Obama and Hillary Clinton, and D'Souza's depiction of his own criminal prosecution. Conservative commentators expressed a mix of full and qualified support for the documentary and D'Souza's intentions.

== Synopsis ==
Setting the stage for a presentation of their views, D'Souza and Sullivan provide counterfactual histories in which George Washington is killed during the Revolutionary War, or the country is divided following civil war, creating a world without America that would be vastly worse off. D'Souza identifies himself as an Indian immigrant who chose America, and has been impressed with what a unique force for good it is, something Americans have traditionally agreed with. He claims modern leftists are “telling a new story”, however, contradicting traditional veneration for America in order to “convince a nation to author its own destruction” and “unmake the America that is here now.” He then challenges several "indictments" made against the country and American exceptionalism, including sociology professor and activist Michael Eric Dyson's claim that “Thievery" was the “critical element” for “American empire” and historian and activist Ward Churchill's assertion that the US is the world's new evil empire, and says that 1960s Chicago radical Saul Alinsky, historian Howard Zinn, and others have promoted guilt and resentment regarding wealth inequality that has helped shape the political careers of Barack Obama and Hillary Clinton.

D'Souza argues that America's wealth has been created, not stolen. He says the $700 used to purchase colonial Manhattan from American Indians could buy many desolate parcels globally today, but that individual industry has made New York real estate worth billions. He states that in Europe, India, and elsewhere most countries have been founded on conquest, and observes that the American pattern of wealth creation hasn't been the universal norm.

The film argues that American Indians exhibited this "conquest ethic" among themselves, and that most of the American Indian depopulation that occurred during European colonization resulted from the accidental transmission of plagues (which had earlier devastated Europe), not from an intent to wipe out a people. The film argues that modern American Indians have little interest in returning to their hunter-gatherer past. In an interview, Senator Ted Cruz compares the Texas Revolution to the American Revolution. Professor and Reconquista advocate Charles Truxillo is contrasted with an interviewed Tejano who says he has no desire to return to a poverty and crime ridden Mexico and instead wants to live the "American Dream".

D'Souza says that slavery impeded American development, rather than boosting it. The film argues that slavery was an omnipresent phenomenon for most of human history, but that its abolition was "uniquely Western", noting the rarity of a "great war fought to end slavery" like the American Civil War. According to the film, the Declaration of Independence essentially says “liberty is the solution to injustice,” a “promissory note” cashed throughout history by Americans such as Martin Luther King Jr. C.J. Walker, the black entrepreneur and daughter of slaves who is regarded as America's first self-made female millionaire, is cited as an example of the type of individual success story the American system allows that is ignored by historians like Zinn because it undermines their leftist narrative. Columbia University economist Jagdish Bhagwati is shown saying that the “world is embracing the free market,” for which there is “no reason for us to be apologetic.” The film attempts to outline how somewhat free enterprise and consumer "choice" rather than "coercion", have possibly raised living standards by making existing goods cheaper and creating new ones.

== Cast ==
- John Koopman as General George Washington, founding father, Continental Army general, and 1st President of the United States
  - Jodie Moore as old George Washington
- Caroline Granger as Martha Washington
  - Lynette Bennette as old Martha Washington
- Don Taylor as President Abraham Lincoln, American lawyer and 16th President of the United States
- Josh Bonzie as Frederick Douglass
- Janitta Swain as Madame C. J. Walker, first female self-made millionaire and philanthropist
- Michelle Swink as Mary Todd Lincoln, Abraham Lincoln's wife
- Rett Terrell as Alexis de Toqueville
- Rodney Luis Aquino as Hernán Cortés
- Michael D. Arite as Major Henry Rathbone
- Chad Baker as Gustave de Beaumont
- Rich Bentz as Saul D. Alinsky
- Todd Trice as Stephen Douglas
- Chris Bauza as young John Fer
- Chad Baker as Gustave de Beaumont
- Walker Theodore Thomas as William Ellison
- Corey Dykes as Christopher Columbus
- Jen Pierce as young Hillary Clinton

== Interviews ==
D'Souza conducted interviews with the following individuals:

- Jagdish Bhagwati, professor of economics and law at Columbia University
- Noam Chomsky, a political commentator and anarcho-syndicalist activist
- Ward Churchill, American author and political activist
- Ted Cruz, the junior United States senator from Texas
- Alan Dershowitz, a scholar on United States constitutional law and criminal law
- Michael Eric Dyson, a professor of sociology at Georgetown University
- John Fer, a U.S. Air Force pilot and former POW of the Vietnam War
- Stanley Kurtz, a conservative commentator
- Temo Muniz, law student, and Hispanic activist
- Star Parker, American syndicated columnist and conservative political activist
- Rand Paul, the junior United States senator for Kentucky
- Ronald Radosh, former Communist Party USA member and American writer
- Harvey Silverglate, American author
- Charles Truxillo, a professor of Chicano at University of New Mexico
- Charmaine White Face, a Native American activist

== Production ==
America: Imagine the World Without Her is directed by Dinesh D'Souza and John Sullivan. The two wrote a screenplay with Bruce Schooley based on D'Souza's book of the same title. The documentary was produced under the director's company D'Souza Entertainment. Sullivan said he was inspired by the History Channel miniseries The Men Who Built America, "I really thought that there was something in that style which allows you to tell a bigger story." The director said the fiscal success of 2016: Obama's America allowed the filmmakers to raise financing for America. Re-enactment scenes were filmed in Camden, South Carolina. Actor John Koopman III, a resident of Colchester, Connecticut who had portrayed General George Washington at state and national parks throughout the United States, was cast to portray Washington in the documentary. Koopman brought his own historical wardrobe and horse for filming, which took place in Camden over the course of four days.

The filmmakers chose to feature clips of celebrities including Woody Harrelson, Matt Damon, and Bono to illustrate the documentary's points to audiences who may be unfamiliar with historical figures like Frederick Douglass. Harrelson is shown condemning the United States's treatment of Native Americans. The film also shows Howard Zinn's history book A People's History of the United States being mentioned by Damon's character in the film Good Will Hunting as well as in the TV series The Sopranos. A clip featuring Bono, who did not participate in the production, is shown to illustrate support for American exceptionalism.

The filmmakers also sought to license the song "It's America" recorded by Rodney Atkins, but the licensing was denied by one of the songwriters due to the political premise of the documentary. They instead involved Dave Mustaine, founder of Megadeth, who recorded a heavy metal guitar version of "The Star-Spangled Banner" for the film. The filmmakers also licensed the song "America" by Imagine Dragons and "Home" by Phillip Phillips.

In addition to the theatrical cut, D'Souza edited an 80-minute cut for educational purposes, removing interviews with political pundits. He said, "It's all purely historical content now."

== Marketing ==
D'Souza released the trailer for America: Imagine the World Without Her on January 26, 2014. He later screened the trailer to 3,500 attendees at the Conservative Political Action Conference in Washington, DC on March 7, 2014. The filmmakers hired Christian marketing firms to create a sermon, replete with video clips, based on the documentary, and make it available for download. The Hollywood Reporter said on June 19, 2014 that over 1,000 preachers had downloaded the sermon and that insiders expected the number to reach 5,000 before the film's release. The filmmakers also emailed 120,000 evangelical churches asking them to promote the film and hired the company Faithit.com to contact 80,000 Christian consumers. In the following July, D'Souza and fellow filmmaker Bruce Schooley traveled to the state of Texas to promote the documentary on radio and television programs owned by Glenn Beck.

D'Souza wrote the book America: Imagine the World Without Her, on which the documentary is based. Shortly before the film's release, the warehouse club Costco pulled the book from its shelves, saying its action was due to low sales. D'Souza called Costco's explanation "preposterous" and noted that his book had only been out a few weeks and was ranked #1 on Amazon.com's bestseller list, while Costco continued to stock hundreds of much lower-selling books. D'Souza asserted the book was pulled because one of Costco's co-founders, James Sinegal, supported Obama's politics. Rush Limbaugh and other media voices on the political right supported D'Souza with widespread criticism of Costco. Costco reordered the book and cited the documentary's release and related interest for the reorder.

Since America: Imagine the World Without Her and its predecessor 2016: Obama's America share "America" in their titles, several film websites, including Rotten Tomatoes, Yahoo! Movies, and MovieTickets.com, had difficulty presenting results for the newer documentary. While these websites resolved the results, the filmmakers contacted the search engine Google to complain about a lack of immediate search results pertaining to the documentary. Other results, including 2016: Obama's America and Captain America: The First Avenger and Captain America: The Winter Soldier, were being shown instead. They expressed concern that a lack of results, including showtimes, would affect the documentary's gross. D'Souza claimed that the lack of search results was politically motivated on Google's part. A preliminary fix stopped listing results for either of D'Souza's documentaries. Google said the term "America" being common in film titles prevented specific results, and it updated its Knowledge Graph to show results for the 2014 documentary.

In August 2014, the nonprofit organization Movie to Movement invited President Barack Obama and members of the United States Congress to a free screening of America. The Hollywood Reporter said the organization "helps to promote small, wholesome movies, many of which seem to have a Christian or conservative theme to them though the group is non-partisan". Movie to Movement's founder and CEO said he budgeted $5,500 to pay for the politicians' tickets and would secure delivery of a digital copy if the documentary was not available in a theater near a politician.

== Release ==
Lionsgate, which handled home entertainment distribution for D'Souza's previous film 2016: Obama's America, acquired rights to distribute America: Imagine the World Without Her in theaters in the United States. Historically, it distributed in theaters two political documentaries, Fahrenheit 9/11 (2004) and Religulous (2008). The UK-based Manifest Film Sales acquired rights to distribute America outside the United States with the goal of screening the documentary at the 2014 Cannes Film Festival, but the screening did not take place.

Lionsgate gave the film a limited release in three theaters in the U.S. cities Atlanta and Houston on June 27, 2014. The cities were selected for premiering America since 2016: Obama's America performed well in them in 2012. The Hollywood Reporter said America "opened to solid numbers" with $39,000 for a theater average of $13,000. The distributor then planned a wide release for the weekend of the U.S. holiday Independence Day on July 4, 2014. On July 2, 2014, Lionsgate expanded the release to 1,105 theaters. For the weekend of July 4–6, 2014, it grossed $2.7 million and ranked 11th at the box office. CinemaScore reported that its sample of opening-night audiences gave the film a rare A+ grade on a scale of A+ to F.

The film concluded its theatrical run after 70 days with a total gross of $14.4 million. The Hollywood Reporter said the gross was "a very strong showing for a documentary film". For 2014, America was the highest-grossing documentary in the United States. The film did not perform as well as 2016: Obama's America, which grossed over $33 million. To date, America ranks as the sixth highest-grossing political documentary in the United States.

Lionsgate released the film on Digital HD on October 14, 2014 and on DVD and Blu-ray on October 28, 2014, a week before the national Election Day on November 4. The home media included 40 minutes of additional footage, including interviews with Ted Cruz, Ward Churchill, Star Parker, and former prisoner of war John Fer. For the week ending November 2, 2014, it ranked third in disc sales after X-Men: Days of Future Past and Mr. Peabody & Sherman. It ranked seventh in Blu-ray sales with 26% of discs sold being Blu-ray.

== Critical response ==
America was not screened for critics, and some have criticized it as an "offensive, right-wing propaganda"; The Times-Picayune reported that that the first handful of reviews were "not particularly glowing", saying that the reviews essentially labeled the film as "partisan". On the review aggregator website Rotten Tomatoes, 8% of 24 critics' reviews are positive, with an average rating of 4/10. The website's consensus reads: "Passionate but poorly constructed, America preaches to the choir." Metacritic, which uses a weighted average, assigned the film a score of 15 out of 100, based on 11 critics, indicating "overwhelming dislike". According to The Hollywood Reporter's Paul Bond, the film performed well in its limited theatrical release, "overcoming several negative reviews in the mainstream media". Bond reported, "Conservatives ... seem thrilled with the movie." USA Today's Bryan Alexander said, "America was savaged by mainstream critics ... It received an 8% critical score on RottenTomatoes.com ... But the film received an 88% positive audience score on the same website."

Joe Leydon of Variety gave America one and a half stars out of five, calling it "a slick, sprawling celebration of American exceptionalism that could, much like its predecessor, make a bundle by rigorously reinforcing the deeply held beliefs and darkest suspicions of its target audience". Leydon said the acting in the historical re-enactments was of inconsistent quality. The critic found that D'Souza gave screen time to those with whom he disagreed, but said, "For the most part, however, D'Souza gives the impression of someone obsessed with whitewashing any and all dark chapters in U.S. history books." Leydon commended the documentary's "tech values" as well as composer Bryan E. Miller's opening theme. The Hollywood Reporter's Stephen Farber also gave the film one and a half stars out of five, saying that D'Souza overstated "anti-American tenets ostensibly running rampant in our society" and that his responses to critiques of America "aren't very convincing". Farber said of the film's production quality, "The battle scenes are competent but no more than that, and the performances are perfunctory at best." Farber said the historical re-enactments would not impress moviegoers who had seen many other historical films, though he called Ben Huddleston's cinematography "striking". The critic concluded, "Here is one more dubious piece of agitprop that will delight the author's fans and have very little impact on his opponents."

TheWrap's James Rocchi gave the film a negative review, saying that the documentary had straw man arguments favoring D'Souza and had anecdotes in place of data, "The film is intellectually and factually spurious, in addition to being ... deeply self-serving." Rocchi called America "technically inept" with "clumsy" editing and added, "The sound mix is incomprehensibly sloppy. Graphics look slapdash; historical recreations are either cheap-looking, unintentionally funny, or both." The critic said while liberal filmmaker Michael Moore "may be self-important at his worst", that he could direct a better film than D'Souza and Sullivan. The A.V. Club's David Ehrlich also gave the film a negative review, saying that America had straw man arguments, "[D'Souza and Sullivan are] hellbent on pacifying the American guilt they believe was responsible for Obama's election, desperately attempting to assuage the national conscience about the evils of colonialism, capitalism, and racism." Ehrlich said, "It's admirable that D'Souza is so willing to engage people who don't share his perspective, but his editing and the instructive music with which he pushes it suggest that he's not particularly interested in what they have to say."

In a negative review for Slant Magazine, Rob Humanick said "The cynically opportunistic America descends into another one-note attack on the sitting president, beholden to the same plethora of taboos, half-truths, and outright lies traded en masse by mainstream conservatism for the last seven years." Humanick called the documentary "a carefully cultivated collection of false equivalencies, hyperbolic pronouncements, blatant recontextualizations of others' arguments, and shameless appeals to patriotism, all within a vaguely fear-mongering framework of demonizing the other". The critic said exceptions were cited to excuse America's history and that D'Souza's criticism of Obama did not ask "greater fundamental questions". Humanick concluded, "Anyone who's ever actually studied history outside of public education, or read the texts alluded to throughout America (such as Howard Zinn's A People's History of the United States), will understand the degree to which history has been flattened and narratives simplified for the sake of lending greater legitimacy to these binary-reliant 'lessons.'" In a similarly negative review for The Playlist, Gabe Toro said, "The film plays out like more of a bullet-point presentation than an actual film, taking each argument he thinks liberal minds are having and dissecting each, cherry-picking anomalies in order to confront some sort of liberal 'truth' that doesn't exist." Toro called the documentary "artless propaganda, uninformed, sensationalistic and devoted to buzzphrases ... simplicity ... and grandstanding". The critic said, "Insidiously, these are some of the ways D'Souza and co-director John Sullivan keep the film brisk and conventionally entertaining ... Filled with soaring guitars, pointless blacksmith montages and recreations with porn-level production values ... it's all fist-pumping anti-thought, consisting of baseless revisionist history and idle contrarianism."

Martin Tsai of the Los Angeles Times gave the film two stars out of five, saying, "He attempts to debunk [Howard] Zinn through apagoge, as if finding an exception to Zinn's every rule will invalidate Zinn's entire argument ... D'Souza makes some cogent points yet will not concede the existence of any gray area. The possibility that he and Zinn could both be right seems unfathomable." Tsai said, "America seems more intent on editorializing, razzling and dazzling than on stimulating civic debate." He summarized, "It's far more invested in elaborate historical reenactments, hypothetical dramatizations and special effects than interviews, research and data."

== Political commentary ==
U.S. News & World Report's Nicole Hemmer said D'Souza's documentary was intended for conservatives and conveyed the premise that leftist radicals portrayed American history as shameful to win political power. Simon van Zuylen-Wood, writing in National Journal, said the film treated "the radical-left worldview of marginal figures like Bill Ayers" as representative of American liberalism and that it engaged "in a selective historiography" like minimizing slavery in the United States by highlighting the existence of black slaveholders. Zuylen-Wood also compared D'Souza to liberal filmmaker Michael Moore in how both use their roots to convey their messages and how they are both central characters in their documentaries, introducing "one ideological pathology after another" to moviegoers.

Mark Stricherz of The Atlantic said that D'Souza message suffered "the intellectual pitfalls of ignoring the critics", finding that he did not contextualize Obama's phrase "You didn't build that" in America. Stricherz said, "At times, America lives up to D'Souza's old intellectual standards. He meets in person with left-wing critics... He argues persuasively that Alexis de Tocqueville is a more reliable guide than Howard Zinn to troubling episodes in early American history such as slavery and the treatment of Native Americans." Stricherz concluded, "D'Souza's pride, his belief he needs neither intellectual nor moral critics, has brought about his fall from the first rank of conservative intellectuals." John Tamny of Forbes said, "D’Souza's America is noble in its effort to discredit myths about the U.S. as a genocidal, thieving, racist, capitalistically rapacious nation, but really, who believes this? It's popular in the victimized portion of the conservative movement to assert that those who love the U.S., freedom, and the prosperity it delivers do so in silence out of fear that the majority haters will persecute them for having those views, but let's be serious. This extreme kind of thinking is all too rare as we all well know."

John Fund of National Review said the documentary was a response to U.S. progressive critique of the country: "D'Souza's film and his accompanying book are a no-holds-barred assault on the contemporary doctrine of political correctness." Fund said D'Souza's message was "deeply pessimistic" but concluded, "Most people will leave the theater with a more optimistic conclusion: Much of the criticism of America taught in the nation's schools is easily refuted, America is worth saving, and we have the tools to do so in our DNA, just waiting to be harnessed." National Review's Jay Nordlinger said: "Dinesh is the anti-Moore: taking to the big screen to press conservative points... The shame narrators (let's call them) focus on maybe 20 percent of the American story. Dinesh simply puts the other 80 percent back in." Nordlinger bisected the documentary: "The first [part] deals with the 'shame narrative.' The second deals with today's politics, and in particular presidential politics." The conservative commentator said: "The second movie confirms for me that one of Dinesh's great advantages is that he is absolutely clear-eyed about the Third World. While liberal Americans romanticize it, he has lived it."

In the liberal Daily Kos blog, Dan Falcone wrote: "D’Souza's film America sets out to report that anyone who tries to make America more democratic or inclusive is motivated by disdain for the country." Media Matters for America called the film "racially charged agitprop". In Salon, Elizabeth Stoker Bruenig called it a "laughable embarrassment" which ranges "from atrociously bad argumentation to humiliating propaganda".

=== Rebuttal of Howard Zinn ===
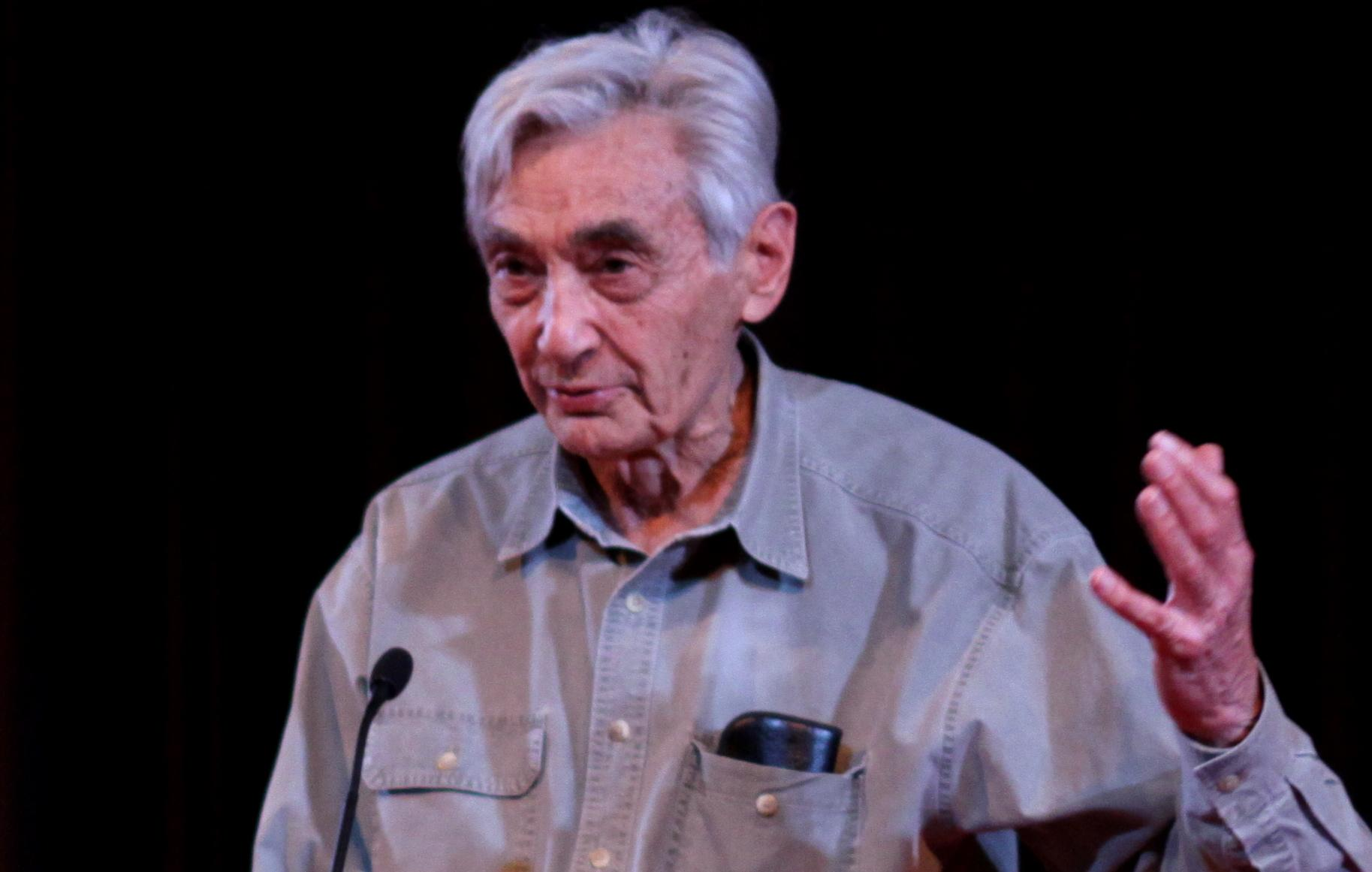
The writings of historian Howard Zinn, author of A People's History of the United States, was a key focus in D'Souza's documentary

In the documentary, D'Souza counters four "indictments" of the United States made by historian Howard Zinn: the treatment of Native Americans, slavery, the transfer of Mexico, and its colonialist behavior. John Fund in National Review said, "Consider his treatment of those subjects as his direct rebuttal to... Zinn, whose textbooks treating America's history as one of ceaseless oppression dominate many American high schools and colleges." Andrew Romano, writing for The Daily Beast, said Zinn was for D'Souza "a somewhat smaller target" than Obama in his previous documentary. Romano said the filmmaker's counterarguments were disingenuous and did not prove Zinn wrong. U.S. News & World Report's Hemmer said D'Souza's statement that Zinn's book A People's History of the United States was part of mainstream education was incorrect: "Though influential, the book was hardly hegemonic. It was even sharply criticized by prominent historians." Hemmer said Eric Foner's textbook Give Me Liberty! was more common than Zinn's book and was even critical of the book as pessimistic.

=== Treatment of Alinsky, Obama, and Clinton ===
In the documentary, D'Souza says Barack Obama and Hillary Clinton were followers of the left-wing activist Saul Alinsky. John Fund of National Review said "D'Souza is the first filmmaker to mine the rich material showing the radicalism of Alinsky." National Review's Jay Nordlinger said "I myself depart a bit from D'Souza on Alinskyism: I regard Obama and Hillary as mainstream Democrats, no different from Nancy Pelosi, John Kerry, and the rest of the gang. And this gang commands the respect, or at least the votes, of approximately half the country." Gabe Toro, reviewing for Indiewire's The Playlist, said D'Souza "flat-out compares" Alinsky to the Devil and then suggests Alinsky's influence on Clinton and Obama. National Journal's Zuylen-Wood said despite Alinsky dying when Obama was a teenager in Hawaii, the film portrayed Obama as one of Alinsky's "most famous disciples". U.S. News & World Report's Hemmer said Alinsky was a focus in D'Souza's film because President Obama was not up for reelection in 2016, so his argument about Obama's heritage could not apply to Hillary Clinton if she became a Presidential candidate. With Obama and Clinton both having links to Alinsky, Hemmer said Alinsky "has become the natural conduit to transfer criticisms of Obama to Clinton".

The Guardian's Ben Beaumont-Thomas said Hillary Clinton was a key focus in the documentary due to the likelihood of her being a candidate in the 2016 U.S. presidential election. Beaumont-Thomas said the TV networks NBC and CNN avoided producing miniseries about Clinton, "Both right- and leftwing voices expressed concern that the series would be either too favourable to Clinton or too politically cautious. Liberal voices will now likely clamour for a counterweight to D'Souza's film."

=== Filmmaker's prosecution ===
Toward the end of the film, D'Souza shows himself on camera wearing handcuffs, referring to his criminal conviction for violating election campaign finance laws. Joseph Amodeo, a political scientist and policy researcher for The Huffington Post, said the scene "appears to be an apology to his 'fans' and an awkward show of penance for recent improprieties on his part." Michael Berkowitz, also writing for The Huffington Post, said of the scene, "[D'Souza's] suggestion that his own criminal conviction and his cheating on his wife are the result of political targeting are embarrassing and without support." National Review's Fund said of the scene, "He clearly conveys his view that he was selectively prosecuted. But viewers should take the film on its own merits, he says, regardless of what they think of him."

== Proposed legislation ==
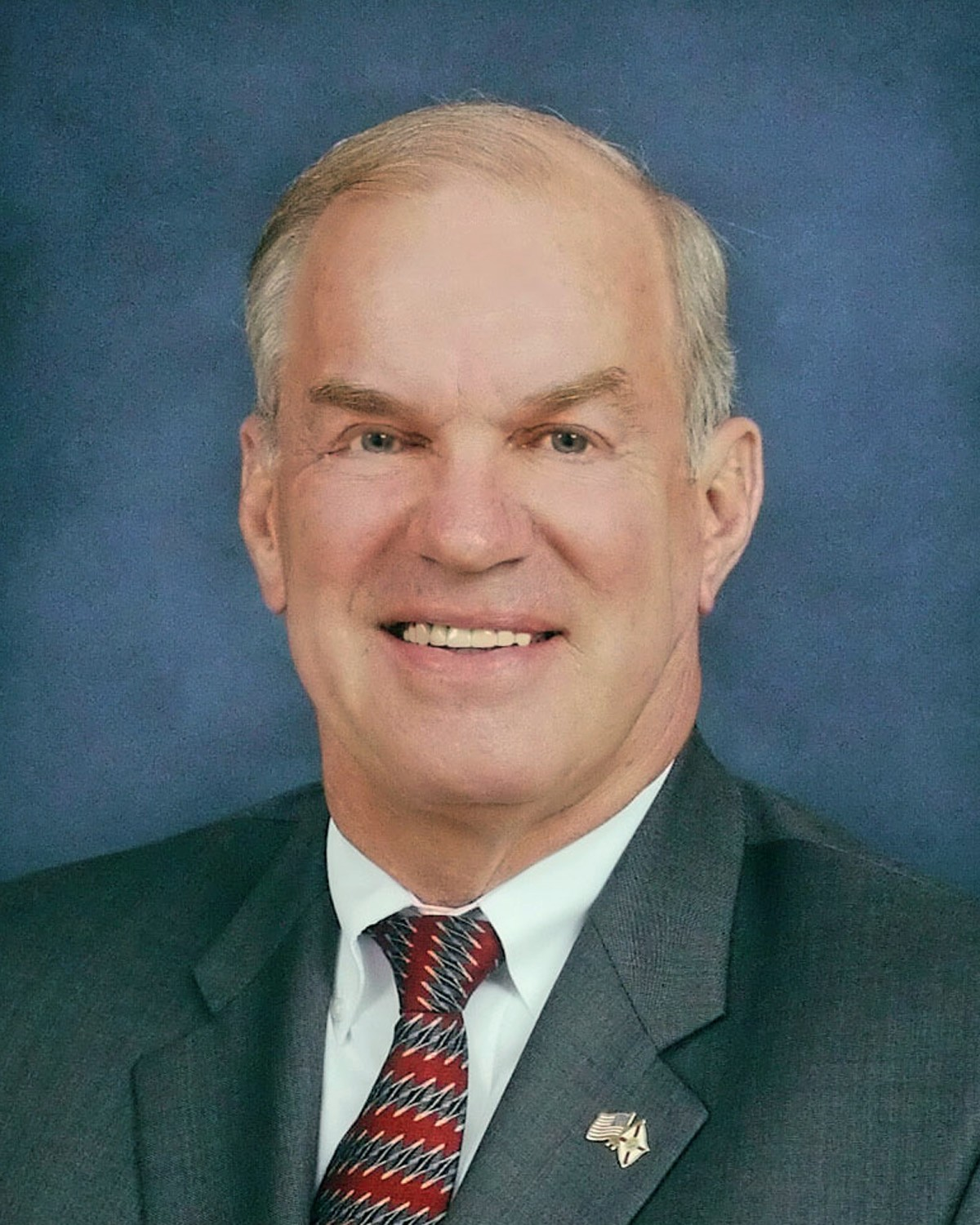
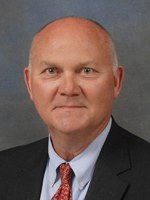
Florida's State Senator Alan Hays and State Representative Neil Combee both filed a bill to require Florida's students to see the documentary

Alan Hays, a Republican member of the Florida State Senate, saw America in theaters in July 2014 and subsequently announced his intent to propose state legislation to require middle school and high school students in Florida's public school system to see the film. Hays said, "I've looked at history books and talked to history teachers and the message the students are getting is very different from what is in the movie. It's dishonest and insulting. The students need to see the truth without political favoritism." Hays said he would not object if America was paired with a liberal film and that he would requisition copies of America from charitable groups to give schools to avoid burdening Florida's taxpayers. In November 2014, Hays filed a bill in the state senate to require seeing the documentary. The Tampa Bay Times said Hays "received heavy criticism that he was foisting propaganda on children". Hays asked Neil Combee, a Republican member of the Florida House of Representatives, to support his bill. After Combee watched the documentary and discussed it, he agreed to file a companion bill. Combee filed the House bill in the following December, and the Times said the companion bill increased the likelihood of the legislation being adopted. The proposed bill required all of Florida's eighth and eleventh graders to watch America. The bill includes an option for parents to opt their children out of the film screening.

The liberal advocacy group People for the American Way criticized it for supporting a political documentary and as a cinematic selection by legislators rather than educators. Southwest Florida's television station WINK-TV reported that critics said the legislation was "propaganda and ignorant". The head of Collier County's local Libertarian Party, Jared Grifoni, did not contest the content but the attempted requirement, "We should be working to get rid of political and social engineering in schools regardless which side of the aisle is pushing it. This is the right side of the aisle pushing their agenda on students while accusing the left of the same thing."

The House bill garnered eight co-sponsors. It ultimately died in the K-12 Subcommittee on April 28, 2015. The Senate bill died in the Committee on Pre-K to 12 on May 1, 2015.

== See also ==
- Political cinema
- List of documentary films
