= Robert A. Cook =

American academic administrator

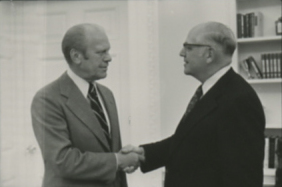
- Cook greeting President Gerald Ford in 1976
- Born: 7 June 1912; Santa Clara, California
- Died: 11 March 1991 (aged 78); New York City
- Occupations: College president, radio broadcaster, pastor, author
- Spouse: Coreen Cook (née Nilsen)
- Children: Carolyn, Marilyn, and Lois
- Parent(s): Charles and Daisy Cook

Robert Andrew Cook (June 7, 1912 – March 11, 1991) was an American pastor, radio broadcaster, and college president. He was president of The King's College (New York) in Briarcliff Manor. He was also Christian author, radio broadcaster, and pastor.

== Early life and education ==
He was born in Santa Clara, California, to Charles and Daisy Cook. His mother died when he was about 16 months old. His dad raised him and his sister, Mildred.

He went to Moody Bible Institute when he was 16 years old. After graduating, he went to Wheaton College in Illinois and earned a B.A. He then went to Eastern Baptist Theological Seminary, and was ordained a Baptist minister in 1931, serving 18 years as a full-time pastor.

== Career ==
In 1962, he became the second president of The King's College when it was in Briarcliff Manor. He served in this position until 1985, and then became Chancellor of the college until his death.

Cook's most famous book, Now That I Believe, was originally published in 1949. It went on to become translated in 27 languages and sold over one million copies.

From 1962 to 1964, Cook served as president of the National Association of Evangelicals. Later, from 1985 to 1988, he was the president of the National Religious Broadcasters.

His daily radio program, The King's Hour, was broadcast for 29 years. Now known as Walk with the King, it is currently aired on Family Radio and other stations. His most recognizable and famous lines from his radio broadcasts is where Dr. Cook opens with "Hello my radio friend...how in the world are you?" and his closing of "Until I meet you once again by way of radio, walk with the King today, and be a blessing!" His radio program series is heard daily on Family Radio.

== Personal life ==
In 1935, Cook married Coreen Nilsen, and they had three daughters.
