= Northeastern Bible College =

College in New Jersey, United States

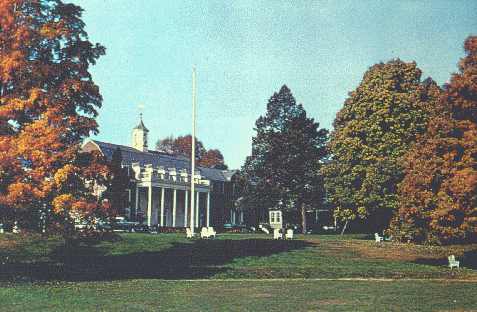
- Whittle Hall (circa 1980)

General information
- Location: Essex Fells, NJ 07021, United States

Northeastern Bible College was founded by Charles W. Anderson and first opened in September 1950 as Northeastern Bible Institute, at the Brookdale Baptist Church in Bloomfield, New Jersey. The college relocated to a campus in Essex Fells in the fall of 1952. The name was changed in 1964 to Northeastern Collegiate Bible Institute, and finally in 1973 to Northeastern Bible College.

Northeastern won the 1st official NCCAA D-I Soccer Championship in the Fall 1973 and in the spring of 1974, was granted full accreditation by the Middle States Association of Colleges and Schools. The school closed in 1990 because of financial difficulties and low enrollment, but the board of trustees was required by its by-laws to give the institution's assets to a like-minded organization before it could disband. The college library, containing 27,000 volumes of Bible and theology resources, was later acquired by The Master's University in Santa Clarita, California, in 1990. The King's College, which had closed its Briarcliff Manor, NY campus in 1994 because of its own financial difficulties, was revived in 1998 and received Northeastern's monetary assets in 1999. This allowed King's to lease two floors in the Empire State Building, where it operated until relocating to Lower Manhattan, near Wall Street, in 2012. Northeastern Bible College served over 4,000 students, and 70% of its alumni are engaged in full-time Christian service.

== School presidents ==
- Charles W. Anderson, 1950-1980
- J. Gordon Henry, 1980-1984
- Robert Benton, 1984-1987
- James Bjornstad, 1987-1990

== Alumni transcript information ==
Transcripts for Northeastern Bible College, as well as for The King's College, are available from the National Student Clearinghouse.
