= Gregory Alan Thornbury =

American academic

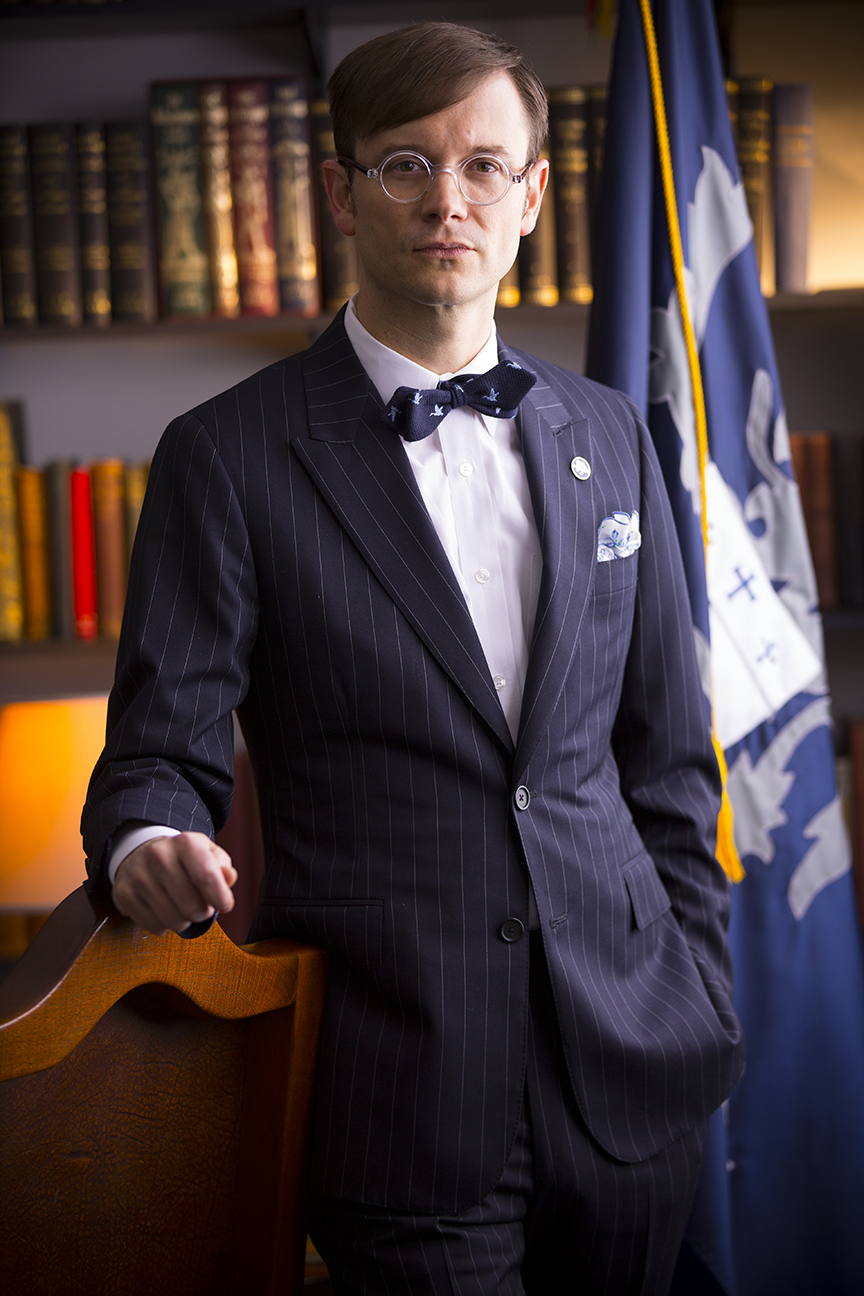

President of The King's College
- In office July 11, 2013 – November 21, 2017
- Preceded by: Dinesh D'Souza
- Succeeded by: Tim Gibson

Vice President of the New York Academy of Art
- In office 2018 – June 2023

Executive Director of Silver Art Projects
- In office June 2023 – Now

Personal details
- Born: 20 November 1970 (age 55) Lewisburg, Pennsylvania
- Education: Messiah College; Southern Baptist Theological Seminary; Green Templeton College, Oxford
- Profession: Professor, university president

Gregory Alan Thornbury is an American academic. He currently serves as the Executive Director of Silver Art Projects at The World Trade Center. Thornbury formerly served as the president of The King's College in New York City from 2013 to 2017, and chancellor from 2017 to 2018. Before his tenure at King's College, he was professor of philosophy, dean of the School of Theology and Missions, and vice president for spiritual life at Union University in Jackson, Tennessee. He was also formerly vice president of development at the New York Academy of Art in New York City.

== Early life and education ==
Thornbury grew up in Lewisburg, Pennsylvania. His father, John Forrest Thornbury, was Pastor of the Winfield Baptist Church outside of Lewisburg. Greg Thornbury attended Messiah College for his undergraduate studies. He graduated from Messiah College in 1993, with a B.A. in communications. At Messiah College, he met his future wife, Kimberly. They married shortly after their simultaneous graduations from Messiah and moved to the campus of Southern Seminary in the summer of 1993. In 1996, Thornbury received a Master of Divinity from Southern Seminary, and subsequently enrolled in the Ph.D. program at Southern with an emphasis in philosophical theology under the supervision of R. Albert Mohler, and completed additional graduate study at Green College in Oxford (now Green-Templeton College). He finished his dissertation in 2001 in the area of religious epistemology. During his days as a graduate student, he came to know Carl F.H. Henry through correspondences and meetings. Thornbury relates how he had come close to losing his faith, but that reading Henry helped secure his faith: "Henry showed me how to be both a scholar and a follower of Jesus."

== Professional career ==
Thornbury was ordained in 1996 at the First Baptist Church (Southern Baptist) of Clarksville, Indiana. Most of his career has been spent in higher education at Union University in Jackson, Tennessee. In 1998, David Dockery of Union recruited him to teach philosophy, and he received tenure in 2006 after being promoted to associate professor. In 2000, he assumed the role of director of the Carl F. H. Henry Center for Christian Leadership, after acquiring permission from Henry for the name.

In 2006, Thornbury became the founding dean of the Union School of Theology and Missions at Union University, where he initiated several new graduate programs, including a doctoral program in Singapore. He also supervised Union's Spiritual Life division as vice president, and led the university's chapel, and campus discipleship programs.

Thornbury accepted the position of vice president at the New York Academy of Art and resigned as chancellor of King's College in 2018. In 2023, Thornbury joined Silver Art as its executive director, following his tenure as vice president of the New York Academy of Art. He was introduced to the organization through a conversation with the Silverstein Family at a dinner event and subsequently accepted the role. Silver Art Projects is a nonprofit residency program, founded in 2019 by Cory Silverstein and Joshua Pulman, and based at the World Trade Center and offers artists free studio space and stipends.

He has been active in the arts, and has spoken at exhibitions of the work of Carl Perkins, Larry Norman, and Daniel Johnston. He has also served as a visiting professor at Ansgar Teologiske Høgskole in Norway. In recent years, he has critiqued evangelical Christianity and distanced himself from its ideas and institutions.

== The King's College ==
On July 11, 2013, The King's College named Thornbury as its sixth president. He began his presidency there on August 1, 2013. The announcement was seen as a return to King's founding vision as a Christian, evangelical college and a repudiation of the political direction it had taken during Dinesh D'Souza's tenure. Religious and secular media such as First Things, World Magazine, the Washington Post, the Huffington Post, and The American Spectator covered the appointment.

In November 2017, the board of trustees announced that it was restructuring its leadership and that Thornbury would become chancellor. Tim Gibson, then the executive vice president, was appointed acting president.

The press release did not state a reason for the restructuring or effective dates. Thornbury said that he left the college because of board members' and donors' support of Donald Trump.

== Writings ==
Much of Thornbury's writing is concentrated on Baptist and evangelical Christianity. He has written a biography of Larry Norman, who is widely considered to be one of the "Jesus Rock" pioneers of the 1970s. The book Why Should the Devil Have All the Good Music?: Larry Norman and the Perils of Christian Rock was released in March 2018 by Penguin Random House. His book on Larry Norman has received widespread praise including a substantially positive mention in an article in The New Yorker magazine written by Kelefa Sanneh.

He is a scholar of Carl F. H. Henry's life and work, and he authored Recovering Classic Evangelicalism: Applying The Wisdom and Vision of Carl F. H. Henry in March 2013. He is the co-editor and co-author of Who Will Be Saved? Defending the Biblical Understanding of God, Salvation, & Evangelism and Shaping a Christian Worldview: The Foundations of Christian Higher Education. He has contributed to volumes such as A Theology for the Church, Faith and Learning: A Handbook for Christian Higher Education, The Lord's Supper: Remembering and Proclaiming Christ Until He Comes.

Books written or edited by Gregory Alan Thornbury include:

- Who Will Be Saved? defending the biblical understanding of God, salvation, & evangelism. Wheaton, Ill: Crossway Books. 2000. ISBN 978-1-58134-143-0.
- Shaping a Christian Worldview: The Foundations of Christian Higher Education. Edited by David S. Dockery & Gregory Alan Thornbury; Broadman & Holman: Nashville, TN (September 2002). (author of Chapter 2: "The Lessons of History"). Nashville, TN: Broadman & Holman. 2002. ISBN 978-0-8054-2448-5.
- Faith and Learning: A Handbook for Christian Higher Education. Edited by David S. Dockery. Gregory Alan Thornbury (author of chapter: "Biblical and Theological Studies in the Christian University"). Nashville, Tenn: B & H Academic. 2012. ISBN 978-1-4336-7311-5.
- Thornbury, Gregory Alan; Henry, Carl F. H. (2013). Recovering Classic Evangelicalism: Applying the Wisdom and Vision of Carl F. H. Henry. Wheaton, Ill: Crossway. ISBN 978-1-4335-3062-3.
- Bigger on the Inside: Christianity and Doctor Who. Baltimore, MD: Square Halo Books. 2015. ISBN 1-941106-00-5.
- Convictional Civility: Engaging the Culture in the 21st Century: Essays in Honor of David S. Dockery. Nashville, Tennessee: B & H Academic. 2015. ISBN 978-1-4336-8508-8.
- Dreams, Doubt, and Dread: the Spiritual in Film. Eugene, Oregon: Cascade Books. 2016. ISBN 978-1-4982-2308-9.
- Thornbury, Gregory Alan (2018). Why Should the Devil Have All the Good Music? Larry Norman and the Perils of Christian Rock. Erscheinungsort nicht ermittelbar: The Crown Publishing Group. ISBN 978-1-101-90707-8.0
