= Bryan E. Miller =

American film composer and pianist (born 1965)

- Born: September 23, 1965 (age 61); Albuquerque, New Mexico
- Occupations: Film Composer, Pianist, founder of Sensory Overload Music
- Years active: 1993–present
- Website: www.bryanemiller.com

Bryan E. Miller (born September 23, 1965) is an American film composer, pianist, and music producer based in Los Angeles, California. Miller has scored several documentaries including America: Imagine The World Without Her.

== Career ==
After leaving his hometown of Albuquerque, New Mexico to pursue a career in film composition, Miller began studying at the Grove School of Music and the UCLA Extension film-scoring program. Early in his career Miller assisted composer Mark Waters on numerous Disney TV episodes, and worked as an orchestrator and conductor for Academy Award-winning composer Mychael Danna.

Miller's compositions can be heard on numerous film, TV, documentary, and commercial projects. He works regularly for clients such as NBCUniversal, Lionsgate, Disney, CBS, ABC, and A&E. His music has been featured on television programs including American Idol, Dancing with the Stars, The Big Bang Theory, Southland, The Shield, and Next Top Model. He has also provided music for Super Bowl commercials and brands such as Microsoft, Taco Bell, Campbell's, Dodge, Wells Fargo, Yamaha, Nike, and the Comcast logo.

In 2014 Miller was chosen to compose the original score for America: Imagine the World Without Her – Dinesh D’Souza's sequel to 2016: Obama's America. This documentary became the sixth highest grossing political documentary of all time. Milan Records released the feature film's soundtrack in 2014.

In 2015, Miller was chosen to compose the original score for Te Ata. The film, based on a true story, details the life of Mary Thompson Fisher, AKA Te Ata Fisher of the Chickasaw Nation, the first Native American woman to earn a theater degree from the Oklahoma College for Women and perform on Broadway. Miller's score won an award for Best Original Music in a Feature in the Gallup Film Festival in 2016.

== Charity Work ==
In addition to Miller's work on documentaries, film, and TV, he spends much of his time composing for faith-based projects and programs such as World Vision, The Museum of Tolerance, and St. Jude Children's Hospital.

== Awards and recognition ==
Awards

- Best Original Music (Feature) for Te Ata – Gallup Film Festival
- LA Drama Critics Award for Music Direction – 1940s Radio
- Best Original Score for Saving Levi – 168 Film Festival
- Telly Award for Best Use of Music – World Vision - Hope Changes Everything
- Omni Award for – Yamaha in Motion

Recognition

- The opening theme for America: Imagine a World Without Her was commended by Variety film critic Joe Leydon as “genuinely stirring”.
