= Faculty Commons =

Faculty Commons is the faculty ministry of Cru, an interdenominational evangelical Christian organization.

Faculty Commons resources groups of Christian professors on over 100 U.S. universities across the country, including locations such as Princeton, University of Pennsylvania, Purdue, University of Texas, University of Georgia, Cal Poly, University of Florida, University of Idaho, and University of California, San Diego.

== History ==
Founded in 1980 as Christian Leadership Ministries by Stan Oakes, the group was re-organized and renamed Faculty Commons in 2006 under a new executive director, Rick Hove.

== National Faculty Leadership Conferences ==
Faculty Commons has sponsored the National Faculty Leadership Conferences since about 1982. The 2008 conference included J. P. Moreland, Richard Pratt, and William Lane Craig as plenary speakers.
