= Fifty Shades =

Adult erotic romance franchise by E. L. James

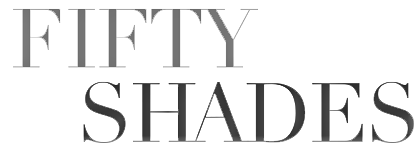
- Created by: E. L. James

Print publications
- Novels: Fifty Shades of Grey (2011); Fifty Shades Darker (2012); Fifty Shades Freed (2012); Grey: Fifty Shades of Grey as Told by Christian (2015); Darker: Fifty Shades Darker as Told by Christian (2017); Freed: Fifty Shades Freed as Told by Christian (2021)

Films and television
- Films: Fifty Shades of Grey (2015); Fifty Shades Darker (2017); Fifty Shades Freed (2018)

Audio
- Soundtracks: Fifty Shades of Grey; Original Motion Picture Soundtrack; Original Motion Picture Score; Fifty Shades Darker; Original Motion Picture Soundtrack; Original Motion Picture Score; Fifty Shades Freed; Original Motion Picture Soundtrack; Original Motion Picture Score; Fifty Shades of Grey Remixed

Fifty Shades is an adult erotic BDSM romance franchise created by British writer E. L. James. It originated as a fanfic for the young-adult teen romance novel series Twilight by American author Stephenie Meyer. That story was turned into a full-length novel titled Fifty Shades of Grey. It has produced a novel series with an original novel trilogy and two follow-up novels, as well as a film trilogy.

== Plot summary ==
Anastasia Steele, a young college graduate, meets Christian Grey, a young business mogul, and becomes his submissive partner. The series explores the development of their relationship.

== Original fan fiction ==
The Fifty Shades novel trilogy (Fifty Shades of Grey, Fifty Shades Darker, Fifty Shades Freed) was originally written as a fan fiction work in the Twilight fictional universe. It was originally called Master of the Universe and written as Snowdragons Icequeen.

== Novel series ==
The original trilogy, Fifty Shades of Grey, Fifty Shades Darker, Fifty Shades Freed, have been published as an omnibus edition called the "Fifty Shades Trilogy".

Title	Release	Notes	Ref
Original trilogy
Fifty Shades of Grey	June 20, 2011		
Fifty Shades Darker	April 17, 2012		
Fifty Shades Freed	April 17, 2012		
Retold
Grey: Fifty Shades of Grey as Told by Christian	June 18, 2015		
Darker: Fifty Shades Darker as Told by Christian	November 28, 2017		
Freed: Fifty Shades Freed as Told by Christian	June 1, 2021		

== Film series ==
Occupation	Film		
Occupation	Fifty Shades of Grey (2015)	Fifty Shades Darker (2017)	Fifty Shades Freed (2018)
Director	Sam Taylor-Johnson	James Foley	James Foley
Producer(s)	E. L. James; Dana Brunetti; Michael De Luca	E. L. James; Dana Brunetti; Marcus Viscidi; Michael De Luca	E. L. James; Dana Brunetti; Marcus Viscidi; Michael De Luca
Writer(s)	Kelly Marcel	Niall Leonard	Niall Leonard
Composer	Danny Elfman	Danny Elfman	Danny Elfman
Director of photography	Seamus McGarvey	John Schwartzman	John Schwartzman
Editor(s)	Lisa Gunning; Anne V. Coates; Debra Neil-Fisher	Richard Francis-Bruce	David Clark; Debra Neil-Fisher; Richard Francis-Bruce
Production Companies	Michael De Luca Productions Trigger Street Productions	Perfect World Pictures; Trigger Street Productions; Michael De Luca Productions	
Distributed by	Universal Pictures	Universal Pictures	Universal Pictures
Runtime (Unrated)	128 minutes	131 minutes	110 minutes
Release date	February 13, 2015	February 10, 2017	February 9, 2018
