= Fifty Shades (novel series) =

Erotic novel series by E. L. James

- Trilogy pack set
- Fifty Shades of Grey (2011); Fifty Shades Darker (2012); Fifty Shades Freed (2012); Grey (2015); Darker (2017); Freed (2021)
- Author: E. L. James
- Country: United Kingdom
- Language: English
- Genre: Erotic romance
- Publisher: Vintage Books
- Published: 2011–2021
- Media type: Print (paperback)

Fifty Shades is a series of erotic novels by British author E. L. James, initially a trilogy consisting of Fifty Shades of Grey (2011), Fifty Shades Darker (2012) and Fifty Shades Freed (2012). The series traces the deepening relationship between college graduate Anastasia Steele and young businessman Christian Grey. Christian introduces Ana to the world of BDSM.

James has spoken of her shock at the success of the book: "The explosion of interest has taken me completely by surprise." She has described the Fifty Shades trilogy as "my midlife crisis, writ large. All my fantasies in there, and that's it." She did not start to write until January 2009, as she revealed while still active on FanFiction.Net: "I started writing in January 2009 after I finished reading the Twilight saga, and I haven't stopped since. I discovered Fan Fiction in August 2009. Since then I have written two fics and plan on doing at least one more. After that ... who knows?" In August 2013, sales of the trilogy saw James top the Forbes' list of the highest-earning authors with earnings of $95 million, which included $5 million for the film rights to Fifty Shades of Grey. In spite of the success, the books have also been largely panned by critics, with the first entry in particular "being ridiculed by virtually every critic who has read it."

Since 2015 the series has been expanded with a parallel set of novels "as told by Christian": Grey follows the events of Fifty Shades of Grey but from the perspective of Christian Grey, Darker (2017) and Freed (2021) do the same for Fifty Shades Darker and Fifty Shades Freed, respectively.

== Plot overview ==
Original trilogy

1. Fifty Shades of Grey (2011)
2. Fifty Shades Darker (2012)
3. Fifty Shades Freed (2012)

Told by Christian trilogy

1. Grey (2015)
2. Darker (2017)
3. Freed (2021)

== Main characters ==
- Christian Grey: 27-year-old incredibly successful, wealthy entrepreneur and owner of Grey Enterprises Holdings, Inc. Adoptive son of Carrick Grey and Dr. Grace Trevelyan Grey. Primary love interest and husband of Anastasia Steele.
- Anastasia "Ana" Steele: College graduate, former PA to Jack Hyde now commissioning editor at Seattle Independent Publishing and primary love interest and wife of Christian Grey.
- Elena Lincoln: Christian's longtime family friend and business partner, sexually abused & seduced Christian as her submissive for 6 years until he was 21. She is described as a tall, elegant, sexy, regal platinum blonde and appears to be in her late 40s.
- Elliot Grey: Son of Carrick Grey and Dr. Grace Trevelyan-Grey, and older brother to Christian and Mia Grey. Love interest of Kate Kavanagh.
- Mia Grey: Daughter of Carrick Grey and Dr. Grace Trevelyan Grey and younger sister of Christian and Elliot.
- Katherine "Kate" Kavanagh: Ana's best friend and roommate. Love interest of Elliot.
- Jack Hyde: Former commissioning editor at Seattle Independent Publishing, sexually harassed Ana.
- Leila Williams: A former submissive of Christian. Tried to shoot Ana.
- Jason Taylor: Christian's most trusted bodyguard/driver and the head of Christian's security team.
- Dr. Grace Trevelyan-Grey: Christian's adoptive mother.
- Carrick Grey: Christian's adoptive father.
- Carla May Wilks: Ana's mother.
- José Rodriguez: A close college friend of Ana Steele and Kate Kavanagh. Works as a photographer. In love with Ana.

== Critical reception ==
Salman Rushdie said about the book: "I've never read anything so badly written that got published. It made Twilight look like War and Peace." Maureen Dowd described the book in The New York Times as being written "like a Brontë devoid of talent", and said it was "dull and poorly written". Jesse Kornbluth of The Huffington Post said: "As a reading experience, Fifty Shades ... is a sad joke, puny of plot".

Princeton professor April Alliston wrote, "Though no literary masterpiece, Fifty Shades is more than parasitic fan fiction based on the recent Twilight vampire series." Entertainment Weekly writer Lisa Schwarzbaum gave the book a "B+" rating and praised it for being "in a class by itself". British author Jenny Colgan in The Guardian wrote "It is jolly, eminently readable and as sweet and safe as BDSM (bondage, discipline, sadism and masochism) erotica can be without contravening the trade descriptions act" and also praised the book for being "more enjoyable" than other "literary erotic books". However, The Telegraph criticized the book as "treacly cliché" but also wrote that the sexual politics in Fifty Shades of Grey will have female readers "discussing it for years to come". A reviewer for the Ledger-Enquirer described the book as guilty fun and escapism, but that it "also touches on one aspect of female existence [female submission]. And acknowledging that fact – maybe even appreciating it – shouldn't be a cause for guilt." The New Zealand Herald stated that the book "will win no prizes for its prose" and that "there are some exceedingly awful descriptions", but it was also an easy read; "(If you only) can suspend your disbelief and your desire to – if you'll pardon the expression – slap the heroine for having so little self respect, you might enjoy it."

The Columbus Dispatch stated that, "Despite the clunky prose, James does cause one to turn the page." Metro News Canada wrote that "suffering through 500 pages of this heroine's inner dialogue was torturous, and not in the intended, sexy kind of way". Jessica Reaves, of the Chicago Tribune, wrote that the "book's source material isn't great literature", noting that the novel is "sprinkled liberally and repeatedly with asinine phrases", and described it as "depressing". The book garnered some accolades. In December 2012, it won both "Popular Fiction" and "Book of the Year" categories in the UK National Book Awards. In that same month, Publishers Weekly named E. L. James the 'Publishing Person of the Year', causing an "outcry from the literary world". For example, "What was Publishers Weekly thinking?" asked Los Angeles Times writer Carolyn Kellogg, while a New York Daily News headline read, "Civilization ends: E.L. James named Publishers Weekly's 'Person of the Year'."

=== Depiction of BDSM ===
The Fifty Shades trilogy has also attracted criticism due to its depictions of BDSM, with Katie Roiphe of Newsweek asking "But why, for women especially, would free will be a burden? ... It may be that power is not always that comfortable, even for those of us who grew up in it; it may be that equality is something we want only sometimes and in some places and in some arenas; it may be that power and all of its imperatives can be boring." Zap2it's Andrea Reiher expressed frustration at Roiphe's depiction of the series, stating that "[b]eing submissive sexually is not tantamount to being the victim of abuse" or that they're "giving up their power or their equality with their partner". Other sites such as Jezebel have responded to the article, with Jezebel listing reasons for Fifty Shades of Grey's popularity, stating that "the vast majority of fans fawn over the emotional relationship Anastasia and Christian have, not about the sex."

In an interview with Salon, several dominatrices have responded that while submission can be an escape from daily stresses, they also frequently have male clients and that trust is a big factor in dominant/submissive relationships. One interviewed former dominatrix and author, Melissa Febos, stated that even if the book's popularity was a result of women's "current anxieties about equality" that it "doesn't mean that it's 'evidence of unhappiness, or an invalidation of feminism,' ...it might actually be a sign of progress that millions of women are so hungrily pursuing sexual fantasies independent of men." Writing in The Huffington Post, critic Soraya Chemaly argued that interest in the series was not a trend, but squarely within the tradition and success of the romance category which is driven by tales of virgins, damaged men and submission/dominance themes. Instead, she wrote, the books are notable not for transgressive sex but for how women are using technology to subvert gendered shame by exploring explicit sexual content privately using e-readers. Instead of submission fantasies representing a post-feminist discomfort with power and free will, women's open consumption, sharing and discussion of sexual content is a feminist success.

At the beginning of the media hype, Dr. Drew and sexologist Logan Levkoff discussed the book on The Today Show, about whether Fifty Shades perpetuated violence against women; Levkoff said that while that is an important subject, this trilogy had nothing to do with it – this was a book about a consensual relationship. Dr. Drew commented that the book was "horribly written" in addition to being "disturbing" but stated that "if the book enhances women's real-life sex lives and intimacy, so be it." Amy Bonomi, a Human Development and Family Studies professor argues that the relationship portrayed is non-consensual: "Unable to bear the thought of being alone, Christian employs strategies to "trap" Anastasia, including keeping his violent tendencies private, limiting Anastasia's availability of help and support from her friends and family through his nondisclosure agreement and through verbal and nonverbal intimidation, and attempts to convince Anastasia that she finds his punishments pleasurable"

The term "50-Shadesian" was used by Alison Flood, writing in The Guardian, to describe the cover of Jilly Cooper's 2016 novel Mount! depicting as it does a man in tight jodhpurs, holding a whip with a bulging crotch.

=== Censorship or removal of books ===
In March 2012, branches of the public library in Brevard County, Florida, removed copies of Fifty Shades of Grey from their shelves, with an official stating that it did not meet the selection criteria for the library and that reviews for the book had been poor. A representative for the library stated that it was due to the book's sexual content and that other libraries had declined to purchase copies for their branches. Deborah Caldwell-Stone of the American Library Association commented that "If the only reason you don't select a book is that you disapprove of its content, but there is demand for it, there's a question of whether you're being fair. In a public library there is usually very little that would prevent a book from being on the shelf if there is a demand for the information." Brevard County public libraries later made their copies available to their patrons due to public demand.

In Macaé, Brazil, Judge Raphael Queiroz Campos ruled in January 2013 that bookstores throughout the city must either remove the series entirely from their shelves or ensure that the books are wrapped and placed out of the reach of minors. The judge stated that he was prompted to make such an order after seeing children reading them, basing his decision on a law stating that "magazines and publications whose content is improper or inadequate for children and adolescents can only be sold if sealed and with warnings regarding their content".

== Film adaptations ==
A film adaptation of the book was produced by Focus Features, Michael De Luca Productions, and Trigger Street Productions, with Universal Pictures and Focus Features securing the rights to the trilogy in March 2012. Universal is also the film's distributor. Charlie Hunnam was originally cast in the role of Christian Grey alongside Dakota Johnson in the role of Anastasia Steele, but Hunnam gave up the part in October 2013, with Jamie Dornan announced for the role on 23 October. The film was released on 13 February 2015, and became an immediate success, making it to #1 at the box office with $558.5 million. However, critical reactions were generally negative. After the first film premiered at a special fan screening in New York City on 6 February 2015, director Sam Taylor-Johnson confirmed two sequels to be succeeded after the first film, with Fifty Shades Darker releasing on 10 February 2017 and Fifty Shades Freed releasing on 9 February 2018.

== See also ==
- BDSM in culture and media
- Sadism and masochism in fiction
- Secretary (2002)
