= Fifty Shades of Oy Vey: A Parody =

- Author: Unknown (using the pen name "E. L. Jamesbergstein")
- Language: English
- Subject: Jewish wit and humor
- Genre: Parody, erotica
- Published: 2013
- Publication place: United States
- Media type: Print / On-line
- Pages: 160
- ISBN: 978-0615864372

Fifty Shades of Oy Vey: A Parody is a parody of E.L. James' Fifty Shades of Grey by an anonymous author using the pen name "E. L. Jamesbergstein". It was published in print and e-book editions by Alfred A. Knish in 2013. Described on its book jacket as "So erotic, you'll plotz", the comic novel, which follows the outline of the original Fifty Shades of Grey, tells the story of the relationship between a beautiful young woman, Anatevka Stein, and a portly bagel tycoon, Chaim Silver.

== Synopsis ==
When Baruch college senior Anatevka Stein goes to interview Chaim Silver for the Hillel Newsletter, she encounters a brilliant, lecherous owner of a bagel making plant. Successful, overweight and reeking of herring, he still lives with his mother. Anatevka finds herself irresistibly drawn to all of these qualities. In a series of encounters, Chaim introduces Anatevka to increasingly unusual sexual techniques, often involving Jewish food and Jewish holidays. He also asks her to sign a Kinky Ketubah spelling out their respective sexual obligations. At times, he serenades her with melancholy music on his accordion. As the love story progresses, it gradually reveals the reasons for Chaim Silver's inner sadness and neurotic behavior.

== Reception ==
Journalists and reviewers in the U.S., Canada and overseas have mentioned the spoof of the Fifty Shades books in a generally positive way. Fifty Shades of Oy Vey: A Parody was also cited and its cover used on the WCBS website's coverage of Fifty Shades of Grey and its parodies. An excerpt appeared on the Jewish erotica website Jewrotica.org on March 9, 2015.
