= Fifty Shades Freed (film) =

2018 film directed by James Foley

- Theatrical release poster
- Directed by: James Foley
- Screenplay by: Niall Leonard
- Based on: Fifty Shades Freed by E. L. James
- Produced by: Michael De Luca; E. L. James; Dana Brunetti; Marcus Viscidi
- Starring: Dakota Johnson; Jamie Dornan; Eric Johnson; Rita Ora; Luke Grimes; Victor Rasuk; Jennifer Ehle; Marcia Gay Harden
- Cinematography: John Schwartzman
- Edited by: Richard Francis-Bruce; Debra Neil-Fisher; David Clark
- Music by: Danny Elfman
- Production companies: Perfect World Pictures; Michael De Luca Productions; Trigger Street Productions
- Distributed by: Universal Pictures
- Release dates: February 6, 2018 (Paris); February 9, 2018 (United States)
- Running time: 105 minutes
- Country: United States
- Language: English
- Budget: $55 million
- Box office: $372 million

Fifty Shades Freed is a 2018 American erotic romantic drama film directed by James Foley and written by Niall Leonard, based on E. L. James's 2012 novel of the same name. Produced by Perfect World Pictures, Michael De Luca Productions, and Trigger Street Productions, and distributed by Universal Pictures, it is the third and final installment in the Fifty Shades film series, following Fifty Shades of Grey (2015) and Fifty Shades Darker (2017). The film stars Dakota Johnson and Jamie Dornan as Anastasia Steele and Christian Grey, respectively, and follows the couple as they marry, and must deal with Ana's former boss Jack Hyde (Eric Johnson), who begins to stalk them. The film marked Foley's final directorial effort before his death in 2025.

Following the first film's premiere in February 2015, development on the sequels promptly began. By November 2015, Foley and Leonard were respectively hired to direct and write both sequels, which would be shot back-to-back in 2016. Principal photography on Fifty Shades Freed began simultaneously with Darker in February 2016, in Paris and Vancouver, and ended in July 2016. Composer Danny Elfman, who had scored the previous films, returned to compose the score for the final film.

Fifty Shades Freed premiered in Paris on February 6, 2018, and was released in the United States by Universal Pictures on February 9, including a limited IMAX release. Despite being a box office success, grossing $372 million worldwide against a production budget of $55 million, it was a succsess but the lowest-grossing film of the trilogy. Like its two predecessors, Fifty Shades Freed received unfavorable reviews, with criticism for its screenplay and acting.

== Plot ==
Newlyweds Christian and Anastasia are forced to cut their honeymoon short and return home after receiving news of a break-in at Christian's corporate headquarters. Jack Hyde, Ana's former boss who was fired for sexual assault, stole some computer files.

Christian surprises Ana with a new house and has hired architect Gia Matteo to rebuild it for her. Ana is annoyed when she openly flirts with Grey. She later threatens to fire Gia if she keeps it up, forcing her to stop.

When Christian is away on a business trip, Ana disregards his wishes that she stay at home, and meets her friend, Kate Kavanagh, for a drink. Kate is dating Christian's older brother Elliot and fears he may be having an affair with Gia, his business associate. Jack Hyde attempts to kidnap Ana when she gets home. Her new security team subdues him, and he is arrested.

After arguing with Christian about her night out with Kate, Ana berates him for being controlling and possessive, demanding more freedom. He later surprises her with a trip to Aspen, bringing along Kate, Elliot, Mia, and José. Elliot proposes to Kate, who accepts. It is revealed that Gia was only helping him choose the ring.

The newlyweds continue with their sexual experimentation, but it becomes complicated when Ana announces she is pregnant. Christian is disturbed, as he had other plans for their early years together. He leaves, going on a night-long drunken bender. After he returns, Ana discovers that Christian had texted and met his ex-lover, and former BDSM dominant, Elena Lincoln, who had groomed him as a minor. Angry, she locks herself in the playroom for the night. He searches for Ana in the morning and they continue arguing, with she telling Christian how important the baby is to her.

Shortly after, Hyde is released on a $500,000 bond and phones Ana, demanding a ransom of $5 million in cash in two hours for Mia, Christian's abducted sister, if his demands are not met. Ana must not tell anyone and bring the money alone. She takes a checkbook and revolver from Christian's desk and goes to the bank to withdraw the money.

The suspicious bank manager calls Christian. He thinks Ana is leaving him, but then discovers that Mia being missing and Ana's sudden large cash withdrawal coincide with Hyde's recent release. Hyde instructs Ana to get into a car parked nearby and hand over her phone to the driver. She tricks Hyde by taking the bank manager's phone and slipping hers into the bag of money. She exits the back entrance to discover that the driver and Jack's accomplice is her co-worker, Liz.

At the drop-off site, a psychotic and vengeful Hyde attacks her, kicking her abdomen. Liz tries to stop him as Ana pulls out the revolver and shoots him in the leg. Christian and his security team, who tracked Ana's phone, arrive with the police who apprehend Hyde and Liz. Ana blacks out as she hears Christian's voice.

She wakes up three days later in the hospital with Christian at her side. Though angry at her recklessness and still anxious about fatherhood, he realizes how important their baby is to her, and they reconcile. Christian's adoptive mother Grace assures him that Ana will not leave him. She returns home the next day.

Christian's private investigator, Welch, has left a report showing that Christian and Hyde had shared the same foster family, though Christian seems to have no memory of this. Hyde was envious of Christian being adopted by the wealthy Grey family instead of him. He had also blackmailed Liz with a sex tape into being his accomplice.

Christian and Ana find out where his birth mother is buried. They visit her grave, and he lays flowers on it. Ana reflects on her whole journey with Christian and how they fell in love. She then goes to the red room and invites him to join her, where Christian delivers the dialogue "You're topping from the bottom, Mrs. Grey. But I can live with that."

The final scene is years later with Ana and Christian at their house by the lake with their son, Teddy. Ana is already pregnant with their second child.

== Cast ==
- Dakota Johnson as Anastasia "Ana" Grey, Christian's wife and Teddy's mother.
- Jamie Dornan as Christian Grey, Ana's husband and Teddy's father
- Eric Johnson as Jack Hyde, Ana's former boss and stalker.
- Eloise Mumford as Katherine "Kate" Kavanagh, Ana's best friend and Elliot Grey's fiancée.
- Rita Ora as Mia Grey, the adoptive daughter of Carrick Grey and Dr. Grace Trevelyan Grey, and younger sister of Christian and Elliot Grey.
- Luke Grimes as Elliot Grey, older brother of Christian and Mia Grey, and Kate's fiancé.
- Victor Rasuk as José Rodriguez, one of Anastasia's friends.
- Max Martini as Jason Taylor, Christian's bodyguard.
- Jennifer Ehle as Carla May Wilks, Anastasia's mother.
- Kim Basinger as Elena Lincoln, Christian's former dominant (unrated version only).
- Marcia Gay Harden as Grace Trevelyan-Grey, Christian's adoptive mother.
- Bruce Altman as Jerry Roach.
- Arielle Kebbel as Gia Matteo, the architect recommended by Elliot Grey to design Anastasia and Christian's future home.
- Callum Keith Rennie as Ray, Anastasia's former stepfather.
- Robinne Lee as Ros Bailey, Christian's second-in-command.
- Brant Daugherty as Luke Sawyer, Ana's bodyguard.
- Amy Price-Francis as Liz Morgan, Jack's accomplice.
- Tyler Hoechlin as Boyce Fox, a popular author whose books are published by SIP.
- Ashleigh LaThrop as Hannah, Ana's co-worker and friend.
- Fay Masterson as Gail Jones, Christian's housekeeper.
- Hiro Kanagawa as Detective Clark.
- Kirsten Alter as Prescott, Ana's second bodyguard.

== Production ==
Universal Pictures and Focus Features secured the rights to the trilogy in March 2012. The films were produced by Michael De Luca Productions. At a fan screening of the first film in New York City on February 6, 2015, director Sam Taylor-Johnson confirmed that the book sequels Fifty Shades Darker and Fifty Shades Freed would also be adapted, with the first sequel then set to be released in 2016. After the announcement, Taylor-Johnson told Digital Spy that "It's not my decision [to return], and I haven't been privy to any of the discussions." On November 12, 2015, TheWrap reported that James Foley would direct both sequels, which would be shot back-to-back in 2016, with Niall Leonard writing the script and Michael De Luca and Dana Brunetti returning to produce, along with E. L. James and Marcus Viscidi. Dakota Johnson and Jamie Dornan were also set to return in the lead roles. On February 8, 2016, Arielle Kebbel was cast in the film to play Gia Matteo, a beautiful architect who is hired by Christian to build his home, and on February 12, 2016, Eric Johnson was cast as Jack Hyde, Ana's boss at SIP and stalker. On February 20, 2016, Brant Daugherty signed on to play Sawyer, the personal bodyguard for Anastasia.

=== Filming ===
In November 2015, Universal Studios announced that Fifty Shades Darker and Fifty Shades Freed would be shot back-to-back, with principal photography scheduled to commence in early 2016. Filming took place in Paris and Vancouver from February 9, 2016, to July 12, 2016, under the working title "Further Adventures of Max and Banks 2 & 3". Scenes at the vacation home in Colorado were filmed at Sarah McLachlan's house in Whistler, British Columbia.

== Music ==
The lead single from the film's soundtrack, "For You", performed by Rita Ora and Liam Payne, was released on January 5, 2018. The soundtrack's track list was released on January 8, 2018, including artists Julia Michaels, Sia, Jessie J, Black Atlass, Ellie Goulding, Hailee Steinfeld, Dua Lipa, Rita Ora, Liam Payne and Miike Snow on the 22-song album.

The soundtrack debuted at #5 on Billboard 200 chart with 58,000 equivalent album units.

== Release ==
Fifty Shades Freed was released to theatres on February 9, 2018. The film had a digital release on April 24, 2018, with a Blu-ray Disc, DVD and 4K Ultra HD Blu-ray release following on May 8, 2018.

== Reception ==
=== Box office ===
Fifty Shades Freed grossed $100 million in the United States and Canada, and $272 million in other territories, for a worldwide total of $372 million, against a production budget of $55 million.

In the United States and Canada, Fifty Shades Freed was released alongside Peter Rabbit and The 15:17 to Paris, and was projected to gross $37–40 million from 3,768 theaters in its opening weekend. It made $5.6 million from Thursday night previews, down 2% from the $5.7 million taken in by Fifty Shades Darker the previous year. It ended up making $38.6 million over the weekend, the lowest of the trilogy, but enough to take first place at the box office. The film grossed $10.8 million on Valentine's Day, the third-highest total for when the holiday fell on a weekday, behind The Vow ($11.6 million in 2012) and Darker ($11 million), and bringing its five-day gross to $56.1 million. In its second weekend the film only made $17.3 million, a 55.1% drop.

Worldwide, the film was expected to make $80–90 million from 57 countries, including France, Germany, the UK, Australia, Brazil, Mexico and Japan, for a worldwide debut of $113–130 million in its first three days. It ended up grossing $98.1 million from overseas for a global debut of $136.9 million.

=== Critical response ===
The film garnered largely unfavorable reviews by critics. On review aggregation website Rotten Tomatoes, the film has an approval rating of 11%, based on 192 reviews, and an average rating of 3.3/10. The website's critical consensus reads, "Fifty Shades Freed brings its titillating trilogy to a clumsy conclusion, making for a film franchise that adds up to a distinctly dissatisfying ménage à trois." On Metacritic, the film has a weighted average score of 31 out of 100, based on 43 critics, meaning "generally unfavorable" reviews. Audiences polled by CinemaScore gave the film an average grade of "B+" on an A+ to F scale, the same score earned by Darker, while PostTrak reported that 56% of women (who made up 81% of the opening weekend audience) gave the film a "definite recommend".

Writing for Variety, Guy Lodge was critical of the film, saying "Indeed, a sex-free, PG-13 version of Freed could be cut without shedding a second of narrative coherence, such as it is; one could ask what the point of that would be, though similar queries might be leveled at the film as it stands." Rolling Stone's Peter Travers gave the film zero out of four, stating "With this last entry, we have officially hit the bottom of the barrel. Whips, chains, butt plugs and nipple clips are nothing compared to the sheer torture of watching this movie." Robbie Collin of The Telegraph gave the film one out of five stars, and wrote "This is a film in which one of the more emotionally detailed performances is given by a product-placement Audi."

Jeannette Catsoulis, writing for The New York Times, found the film to be significantly inferior to Kim Basinger's 9½ Weeks, stating: "Layering a damp-squib thriller subplot beneath what appears to be an ad campaign for the one-percent lifestyle, the returning director and screenwriter test the newly married couple with an inconvenient pregnancy and an unconvincing car chase. There's an out-of-left-field abduction and a marital tiff over email addresses; but these narrative fragments, lazily tossed together alongside a neglected supporting cast, are no more than a flimsy causeway connecting bonking sessions."

Conversely, IndieWire reviewer Manuela Lazic gave the film three out of four stars, saying "Finally, the Fifty Shades phenomenon has yielded a disarming comedy that makes this ridiculous material fun to watch."

=== Accolades ===
Award	Date of ceremony	Recipients	Category	Result	Ref.
People's Choice Awards	November 11, 2018	Fifty Shades Freed	Movie of 2018	Nominated	
People's Choice Awards	November 11, 2018	Fifty Shades Freed	Drama Movie of 2018	Won	
People's Choice Awards	November 11, 2018	Jamie Dornan	Drama Movie Star of 2018	Won	
Golden Raspberry Awards	February 23, 2019	James Foley	Worst Director	Nominated	
Golden Raspberry Awards	February 23, 2019	Marcia Gay Harden	Worst Supporting Actress	Nominated	
Golden Raspberry Awards	February 23, 2019	Niall Leonard; based from the novel by E. L. James	Worst Screenplay	Won	
