= Darker: Fifty Shades Darker as Told by Christian =

Erotic romance by British author, E. L. James

Darker: Fifty Shades Darker As Told by Christian
- Author: E. L. James
- Language: English
- Series: Fifty Shades trilogy
- Genre: Erotic romance
- Published: 28 November 2017
- Publisher: Vintage
- Publication place: United Kingdom
- Preceded by: Grey: Fifty Shades of Grey as Told by Christian
- Followed by: Freed: Fifty Shades Freed as Told by Christian

Darker: Fifty Shades Darker As Told by Christian, also referred to as Darker, is a 2017 erotic romance by British author, E. L. James. It is the fifth installment in the Fifty Shades novel series. The books were originally told by Anastasia Steele, the main protagonist, whereas Darker: Fifty Shades Darker as Told by Christian is told from the male character's point of view of the events of the second installment, Fifty Shades Darker.

The novel was released on 28 November 2017.

== Summary ==
After breaking up in Fifty Shades of Grey, billionaire Christian Grey attempts to win back his lover, Anastasia Steele, after he punished her. Initially reluctant to resume the relationship, she only agrees under her own terms. As their relationship progresses, Christian's past and Anastasia's boss, Jack Hyde, threaten the couple.

== Development ==
James announced that she was in the process of writing the novel on 10 September 2016.

== Reception ==
The Guardian considered the book to be No. 1 on the Top 50 Bestselling Books in the United Kingdom, selling more than 300 000 copies in its first week on sale.
