= Fifty Shades Darker (film) =

2017 film by James Foley

- Theatrical release poster
- Directed by: James Foley
- Screenplay by: Niall Leonard
- Based on: Fifty Shades Darker by E. L. James
- Produced by: Michael De Luca; E. L. James; Dana Brunetti; Marcus Viscidi
- Starring: Dakota Johnson; Jamie Dornan; Eric Johnson; Rita Ora; Luke Grimes; Victor Rasuk; Kim Basinger; Marcia Gay Harden
- Cinematography: John Schwartzman
- Edited by: Richard Francis-Bruce
- Music by: Danny Elfman
- Production companies: Perfect World Pictures (Note: Even though Perfect World Pictures produced the film, their logo is not shown on any promotional material or in the film itself.); Michael De Luca Productions; Trigger Street Productions
- Distributed by: Universal Pictures
- Release dates: February 7, 2017 (Hamburg); February 10, 2017 (United States)
- Running time: 118 minutes
- Country: United States
- Language: English
- Budget: $55 million
- Box office: $381 million

Fifty Shades Darker is a 2017 American erotic romantic drama film directed by James Foley and written by Niall Leonard, based on E. L. James's 2012 novel of the same name. Produced by Michael De Luca Productions and Trigger Street Productions, and distributed by Universal Pictures, it is the second installment in the Fifty Shades film series and the sequel to the 2015 film Fifty Shades of Grey. The film stars Dakota Johnson and Jamie Dornan as Anastasia Steele and Christian Grey, respectively, with Eric Johnson, Eloise Mumford, Bella Heathcote, Rita Ora, Luke Grimes, Victor Rasuk, Kim Basinger, and Marcia Gay Harden in supporting roles. It follows Ana and Christian as they must decide to rekindle their relationship, this time with "no rules, no punishments, and no more secrets" terms.

Before the release of Fifty Shades of Grey in 2015, there was high anticipation from fans for the sequel. When the first film premiered at a special fan screening in New York City in February 2015, development on the sequels promptly began. By November 2015, Foley and Leonard were respectively hired to direct and write both sequels, which would be shot back-to-back in 2016. Principal photography was initially set to begin in Vancouver in June 2015. However, it was later postponed due to delays in Leonard finishing the script. Filming on Fifty Shades Darker and its sequel Fifty Shades Freed (2018) ultimately began on February 9, 2016, in Paris and Vancouver, and concluded on April 11, 2016. Danny Elfman, who had scored the first film, returned to compose the score for its sequel.

Fifty Shades Darker premiered in Hamburg, Germany on February 7, 2017, and was released in the United States on February 10, by Universal Pictures. The film grossed $381 million worldwide against its $55 million budget, but received unfavorable reviews for its screenplay, acting and narrative, though some of the performances received some praise. At the 38th Golden Raspberry Awards, the film received nine nominations; including Worst Picture, Worst Actor (Dornan) and Worst Actress (Johnson), and won two for Worst Prequel, Remake, Rip-off or Sequel, and Worst Supporting Actress (Basinger).

== Plot ==
After Anastasia Steele leaves Christian Grey, he has nightmares about his abusive childhood. Meanwhile, Ana begins a new job as an assistant to Jack Hyde, an editor at Seattle Independent Publishing (SIP) whose last three assistants all quit within only 18 months without notice. Ana runs into Christian at the opening of her friend José Rodriguez's photography exhibit. She is dismayed Christian bought all of José's portraits of her. He wants her back and agrees to her "no rules, no punishments, and no more secrets" terms. He also tells her that his birth mother was a crack-addicted sex worker.

As Jack and Ana head for an after-work drink, she is approached on the street by a young woman resembling her. Christian arrives at the bar and is cool towards Jack, then quickly departs with Ana. She dismisses Christian's warning about his reputation, and is annoyed that he is considering buying SIP. Jack tells Ana he expects her to accompany him on a New York book expo trip, but after speaking with Christian, she agrees not to go. Shortly after, Ana again sees the same woman watching them from afar. Christian avoids answering about her identity, but later explains she is Leila Williams, a former submissive. After their contract ended, she wanted more, but he didn't. Leila married a man who later died, causing a nervous breakdown. She has been stalking him ever since. Prior to the Grey family's annual charity ball, Christian takes Ana to Esclava, a beauty salon owned by Elena Lincoln. A family friend, she is also Christian's former dominant who introduced him to the BDSM lifestyle by sexually assaulting him when he was 15. Ana is furious that Christian took her there, and that they are business partners after all that. At the ball, Christian's sister Mia mentions that he was expelled from four different schools for brawling. During the ball, Ana rebuffs Elena's demand that she leave Christian, warning Elena to stay away.

Arriving home, she and Christian discover Leila has vandalized Ana's car. Scared, they leave and go to Christian's yacht where they spend the day boating. Christian tells Ana that his biological mother overdosed and died. He was alone with her body for three days before being taken to the hospital where Dr. Grace Trevelyan-Grey worked; she cared for and later adopted the young boy. Back at work, Ana is told she must attend an expo in New York with Jack causing some tension between her and Christian when he tells her she shouldn't go.

When Ana tells Jack she won't be attending the expo with him, he attempts to sexually assault her while they are alone at work, but she evades him and escapes. Christian exerts his influence to have Jack fired, and Ana is promoted to acting editor in his place. Christian asks Ana to move in with him and she agrees.

At Ana's apartment, Leila, there waiting for her, threatens her with a gun. Christian and his driver/bodyguard, Jason Taylor, enter and Christian disarms Leila by becoming her dominant once more. Ana, deeply disturbed seeing his need to be dominant, leaves, returning several hours later to his apartment. Christian is furious at her unexpected absence, but Ana says she needs time to consider their relationship. Distraught at the idea of Ana leaving him, he submissively drops to his knees, confessing he is not a dominant, but a sadist who enjoys hurting women who look like his birth mother (like Ana). He insists he wants to change. Christian later proposes, but Ana says she needs time to consider this before accepting.

Christian leaves on a business trip, piloting his own helicopter. An engine failure occurs over Mt. St. Helens, forcing him to ditch the craft in a heavily forested area. A massive search and rescue ensues. As Ana fearfully awaits news, he arrives home safely. Ana, realizing how much she loves him, accepts his marriage proposal. At Christian's birthday, Elena accuses Ana of being a gold digger. Ana orders her to stop interfering. Christian overhears and dismissively tells Elena she taught him "how to fuck" while Ana taught him "how to love". Grace overhears the conversation and demands Elena leave for good; Christian also cuts all ties with her. Later that evening, Christian formally proposes to Ana, this time with a ring, and she accepts. As fireworks erupt in the sky, Jack Hyde watches the festivities from afar, silently swearing revenge against them.

== Cast ==
- Dakota Johnson as Anastasia "Ana" Steele
- Jamie Dornan as Christian Grey
- Eric Johnson as Jack Hyde, Ana's boss at SIP and stalker.
- Eloise Mumford as Katherine "Kate" Kavanagh, Anastasia's best friend and roommate, who is in a relationship with Christian's older brother, Elliot Grey.
- Bella Heathcote as Leila Williams, one of Christian's former submissives.
- Rita Ora as Mia Grey, Christian and Elliot's adoptive younger sister.
- Jennifer Ehle as Carla Wilks, Anastasia's mother (Unrated Edition).
- Luke Grimes as Elliot Grey, Christian's adoptive older brother.
- Victor Rasuk as José Rodriguez, one of Anastasia's friends.
- Max Martini as Jason Taylor, Christian's bodyguard and head of security.
- Bruce Altman as Jerry Roach, president of SIP.
- Kim Basinger as Elena Lincoln, Christian's business partner and former lover.
- Marcia Gay Harden as Grace Trevelyan-Grey, Christian's adoptive mother.

== Production ==
Universal Pictures and Focus Features secured the rights to the trilogy in March 2012, and Universal is the film's distributor. The first book of the series was adapted into a film by the same name, and released on February 13, 2015. The adaptation was produced by Focus, Michael De Luca Productions, and Trigger Street Productions. In March 2014, a producer of the first film, Dana Brunetti, had said there were, as of then, no solid plans to make a sequel. Before the first film opened, there was high anticipation from fans for the sequel. When the first film premiered at a special fan screening in New York City on February 6, director Sam Taylor-Johnson announced that the book sequels Fifty Shades Darker and Fifty Shades Freed would also be adapted, with the first to be released in 2016. Right after the announcement, the director told Digital Spy that "it's not my decision, and I haven't been privy to any of the discussions."

On March 25, 2015, Taylor-Johnson officially left the franchise. On April 2, 2015, Deadline confirmed that De Luca had left Sony Pictures to return to Universal to produce the Fifty Shades sequels. On April 22, 2015, it was announced that E. L. James' husband, Niall Leonard, would write the script for the sequel. In April 2015, Universal Pictures chair Donna Langley told The Hollywood Reporter that the second installment would be "more of a thriller." In July 2015, it was confirmed that singer Rita Ora would reprise her role, Mia Grey, in the sequel. On August 20, 2015, it was revealed by Deadline that James Foley was the front-runner to direct the sequel and third film Fifty Shades Freed, while the studio was also eyeing other directors, including Rebecca Thomas, Mark Pellington, and Tanya Wexler, and talks with Foley had not yet begun. On November 12, 2015, TheWrap confirmed that Foley would direct both sequels, which would be shot back-to-back in 2016, with Michael De Luca and Brunetti returning to produce, along with E. L. James. Dakota Johnson and Jamie Dornan were confirmed to return for the sequels.

=== Casting ===
On January 28, 2016, Kim Basinger joined the film, to play Elena Lincoln, Grey's business partner and former dominant, while Luke Grimes, Eloise Mumford and Max Martini were set to reprise their characters from the first film. On February 5, Bella Heathcote was cast as Leila, one of Grey's former submissives. In the same month, Eric Johnson was cast to play Jack Hyde. On February 18, Robinne Lee and Fay Masterson joined the film's cast. On February 26, Tyler Hoechlin was cast to play Boyce Fox, and on April 7, it was reported that Hugh Dancy had joined to play Dr. John Flynn, Grey's psychiatrist; neither actor appeared in the finished film.

=== Filming ===
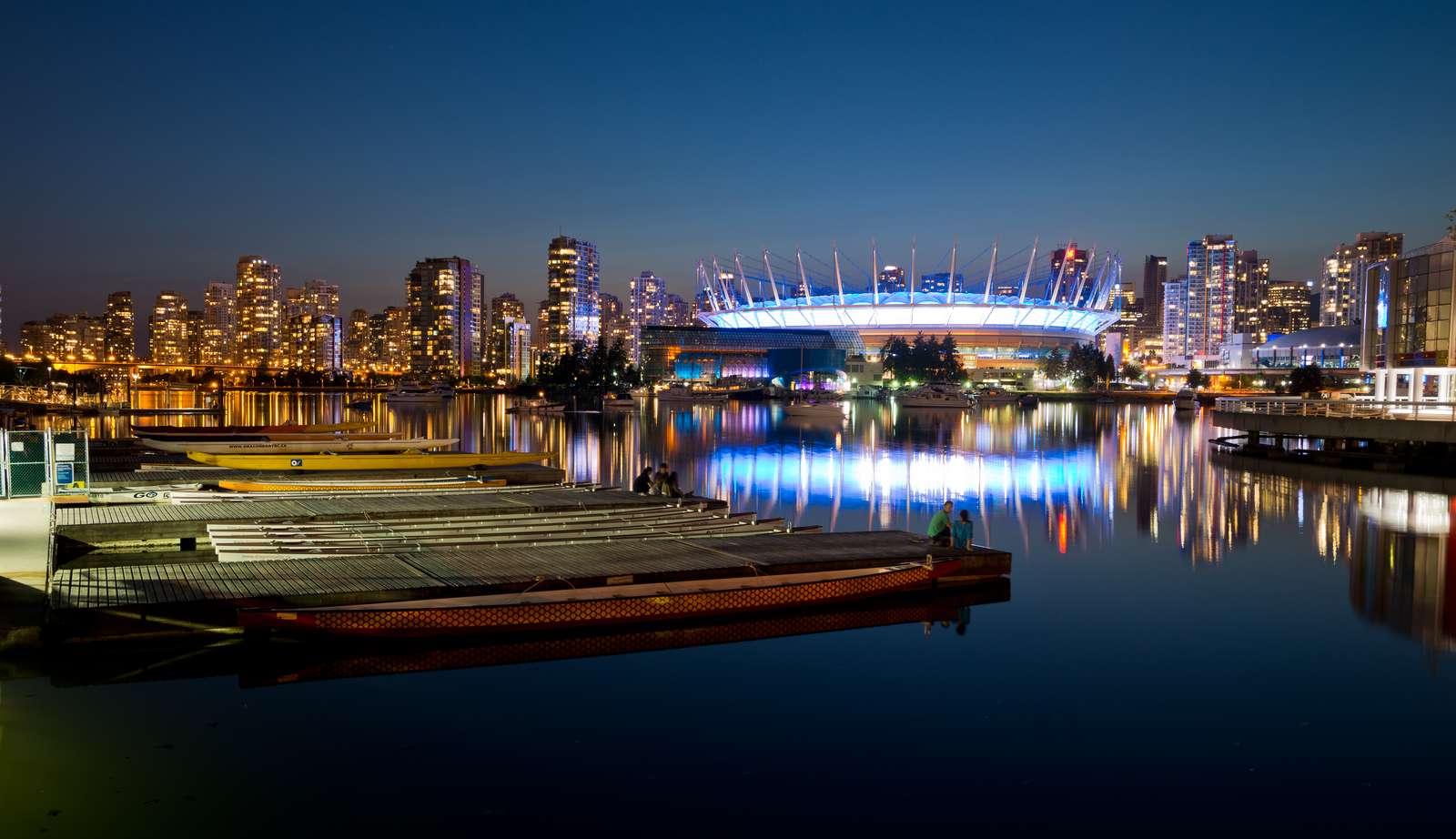
Filming took place in Vancouver, where much of the first film was shot.

Principal photography was initially set to begin in Vancouver in June 2015. However, it was later postponed due to delays in the script. It was later reported that filming would begin in February 2016 in Vancouver, while the studio North Shore Studios was booked for the film. In November 2015, Universal Studios announced that the film and Freed would be shot back-to-back, with principal photography scheduled to commence in early 2016. Filming took place in Paris and Vancouver from February 9, 2016, to July 12, 2016, under the working title, "Further Adventures of Max and Banks 2 & 3." Principal photography concluded on April 11, 2016.

== Music ==
The film's soundtrack was released in two separate versions; one for the 19 popular artists' songs used in the film, and another separate release for the original score composed for the film by Danny Elfman. Two of Elfman's themes were also included on the popular artists' version of the soundtrack release. The film's theme song, "I Don't Wanna Live Forever" by Zayn and Taylor Swift was released on December 9, 2016. The following month, on January 13, 2017, Halsey released the soundtrack's next single, "Not Afraid Anymore".

== Release ==
=== Marketing ===
On September 15, 2016, Universal released the film's first official trailer, which amassed an unprecedented 114 million views in its first 24 hours, from various digital platforms such as Facebook, YouTube and Instagram. It received more than 2.5 million views on the film's official Facebook page. Over 39.4 million views came from North America, while 74.6 million views came from over 32 international markets, including the U.K., Mexico and France. This broke the previous record, held by Star Wars: The Force Awakens, when it received 112 million views in the same amount of time in October 2015. The record was later surpassed by the second trailer for Disney's Beauty and the Beast, with 127.6 million views in November 2016.

=== Rating ===
On November 10, 2016, the sequel was given an R rating by the MPAA for "strong erotic sexual content, some graphic nudity and language."

In Canada, the film was classified under 18A for its sexual content in all provinces except Quebec. In Quebec, which has a different rating system, it was classified under 16+ for its "eroticism". In the United Kingdom, the film was given an 18 certificate for "strong sex".

In the Philippines, the film received an R-18 rating from the Movie and Television Review and Classification Board (MTRCB), which means that only moviegoers aged 18 years and above can watch the film, due to its strong sexual content.

In New Zealand, the film was originally rated R18 along with Fifty Shades of Grey, however in 2019 the film was lowered to R16 for sex scenes, offensive language & nudity.

=== Theatrical ===
Fifty Shades Darker was released on February 10, 2017, by Universal Pictures.

=== Home media ===
The Digital HD was released on Amazon and iTunes on April 25, 2017, while the DVD/Blu-ray debuted on May 9, 2017, and took the number one spot in sales.

== Reception ==
=== Box office ===
Fifty Shades Darker grossed $114.5 million in the United States and Canada and $266.5 million in other territories for a worldwide total of $381.1 million, against a production budget of $55 million.

In the United States and Canada, Fifty Shades Darker opened alongside two other sequels, The Lego Batman Movie and John Wick: Chapter 2, and was projected to gross $32–40 million in its opening weekend. It earned $5.72 million from Thursday night previews at 3,120 theaters, down from the $8.6 million grossed by its predecessor two years prior, but still the sixth-best Thursday preview gross for an R-rated film. The film made $21.5 million on Friday, down 30% from the first film's $30 million opening day, but topped the box office that day. It went on to debut to $46.6 million, down 45% from the first film's $85.1 million, and finished second at the box office behind The Lego Batman Movie ($53.0 million). The film grossed $11 million on Valentine's Day, marking the second-highest amount for when the holiday fell on a weekday, behind The Vow ($11.6 million in 2012), and bringing its five-day gross to $61.5 million. In its second weekend, the film grossed $20.3 million, again finishing second at the box office behind The Lego Batman Movie. This marked a 56.5% drop from its first weekend gross, and was only $2 million behind the amount the first film grossed in its second weekend ($22.3 million), only that marked a drop of 73.9% from its respective debut. In its third weekend, it grossed $7.7 million, dropping to 5th at the box office.

Outside North America, the film was simultaneously released in 57 countries, and was expected to gross $115–155 million over its first three days. It ended up grossing $97.8 million in its opening weekend, the fourth largest R-rated international opening of all time. Its top grossing locations included Germany ($11 million), the United Kingdom ($9.7 million), France ($8.7 million), Brazil ($7.5 million), Italy ($6.8 million), and Russia ($6.7 million).

=== Critical response ===
Much like its predecessor, Fifty Shades Darker received unfavorable reviews from critics, who criticized its screenplay, narrative and Dornan's and Johnson's performances. On review aggregation website Rotten Tomatoes, the film has an approval rating of 11% based on 207 reviews, with an average rating of 3.23/10. The site's critical consensus reads, "Lacking enough chemistry heat or narrative friction to satisfy, the limp Fifty Shades Darker wants to be kinky but only serves as its own form of punishment." On Metacritic, the film has a score of 33 out of 100, based on 39 critics, indicating "generally unfavorable" reviews. Audiences polled by CinemaScore gave the film an average grade of "B+" on an A+ to F scale, an improvement over the "C+" earned by its predecessor, while PostTrak reported filmgoers gave it an 82% overall positive score and a 68% "definite recommend".

Richard Roeper gave the film two out of four stars, saying: "This is one good-looking, occasionally titillating, mostly soapy and dull snooze-fest." Vince Mancini of Uproxx acknowledged the film's flaws, but said watching the film was enjoyable, noting, "Narrative sloppiness aside, as an outsider, sitting through Fifty Shades Darker was a reasonably diverting experience, odd, dumb fun made even more fun by an audience that whooped and shouted at the screen during sex scenes. I didn't really get it, but I enjoyed the feeling of them having fun, though at two hours plus, it's a bit of a slog."

Manohla Dargis writing for The New York Times expressed similar ambiguous opinions regarding the content of the film, stating:

I was still rooting for Ms. Johnson in Fifty Shades Darker, even if it proved tough going. Once again, the story involves the on-and-off, tie-her-up, tie-her-down romance between Anastasia Steele (Ms. Johnson) and her billionaire boyfriend, Christian Grey (Jamie Dornan), a guy with sculptured muscles, expensive playthings and dreary issues. Stuff and kink happens: A gun is fired, a would-be rapist is punished and Anastasia is bound hand and foot. Mostly, she advances and retreats (repeat), mewls and moans, and registers surprise each time Christian tries to dominate her outside the bedroom, evincing the kind of stalkerlike behavior that usually leads to restraining orders.

Richard Brody of The New Yorker described the film as inferior to the first, and found fault in the change in directors, stating:

Some of the greatest Hollywood melodramas (such as Douglas Sirk's Magnificent Obsession) featured plotlines of an even more extravagant absurdity than that of Fifty Shades Darker. Their extreme artifice became a framework for extreme ideas and extreme emotions, even in an era of extreme public reticence about what goes on in the bedroom. The freedom of the current age of sexual explicitness invites realms of characterization—and of intimate imagination—that the first film in the Fifty Shades series hints at and the second one utterly ignores. Fifty Shades Darker's indifference to its characters' identities, conflicts, and desires is matched by its indifference to its own cinematic substance. The film's bland impersonality is grotesque; its element of pornography isn't in its depiction of sex but in its depiction of people, of relationships, of situations that, for all their unusualness, bear a strong psychological and societal resonance. There's nothing wrong with Fifty Shades Darker that a good director couldn't fix.

=== Accolades ===
List of awards and nominations
Awards
| Award | Category | Recipients | Result | Ref. |
|---|---|---|---|---|
| Golden Raspberry Awards | Worst Picture | Michael De Luca, Dana Brunetti, E. L. James, Marcus Viscidi | Nominated | |
| Golden Raspberry Awards | Worst Prequel, Remake, Rip-off or Sequel | Fifty Shades Darker | Won | |
| Golden Raspberry Awards | Worst Director | James Foley | Nominated | |
| Golden Raspberry Awards | Worst Actor | Jamie Dornan | Nominated | |
| Golden Raspberry Awards | Worst Actress | Dakota Johnson | Nominated | |
| Golden Raspberry Awards | Worst Supporting Actress | Kim Basinger | Won | |
| Golden Raspberry Awards | Worst Screen Combo | Any combination of two characters, two sex toys or two sexual positions | Nominated | |
| Golden Raspberry Awards | Worst Screenplay | Niall Leonard | Nominated | |
| Golden Trailer Awards | Best Romance TV Spot | Universal Pictures, Trailer Park | Nominated | |
| Grammy Awards | Best Song Written for Visual Media | Jack Antonoff, Sam Dew & Taylor Swift for "I Don't Wanna Live Forever" | Nominated | |
| International Online Cinema Awards | Best Original Song | Zayn Malik & Taylor Swift for "I Don't Wanna Live Forever" | Nominated | |
| Satellite Awards | Best Original Song | "I Don't Wanna Live Forever" | Nominated | |

== Sequel ==
The final installment of the trilogy was filmed back-to-back with Fifty Shades Darker and was released on February 9, 2018.
