= Fifty Shades of Grey (film) =

2015 film by Sam Taylor-Johnson

- Theatrical release poster
- Directed by: Sam Taylor-Johnson
- Screenplay by: Kelly Marcel
- Based on: Fifty Shades of Grey by E. L. James
- Produced by: Michael De Luca; E. L. James; Dana Brunetti
- Starring: Dakota Johnson; Jamie Dornan; Jennifer Ehle; Marcia Gay Harden
- Cinematography: Seamus McGarvey
- Edited by: Debra Neil-Fisher; Anne V. Coates; Lisa Gunning
- Music by: Danny Elfman
- Production companies: Focus Features; Michael De Luca Productions; Trigger Street Productions
- Distributed by: Universal Pictures
- Release dates: February 9, 2015 (Los Angeles); February 13, 2015 (United States)
- Running time: 125 minutes
- Countries: United States; United Kingdom
- Language: English
- Budget: $40 million
- Box office: $569.7 million

Fifty Shades of Grey is a 2015 erotic romantic drama film directed by Sam Taylor-Johnson from a screenplay by Kelly Marcel. Produced by Focus Features, Michael De Luca Productions, and Trigger Street Productions, it is based on E. L. James' 2011 eponymous novel, and serves as the first installment in the Fifty Shades film series. Starring Dakota Johnson, Jamie Dornan, Jennifer Ehle and Marcia Gay Harden, the film's story follows Anastasia "Ana" Steele, a college graduate, who begins a sadomasochistic relationship with young business magnate Christian Grey.

Development of the film commenced in March 2012, when Universal and Focus Features secured the rights to the trilogy following a bidding war. After Marcel was hired to write the film's screenplay, multiple directors, including Joe Wright, Patty Jenkins, Bill Condon, Bennett Miller, and Steven Soderbergh, were attached to the film. Taylor-Johnson was confirmed as the director in June 2013. She cited 9½ Weeks (1986), Last Tango in Paris (1972), and Blue Is the Warmest Colour (2013) as her inspirations for the film. The main cast joined the project between October and December 2013. Principal photography commenced in December 2013 and concluded in February 2014. Reshoots involving scenes between Dornan and Johnson took place in Vancouver during the week of October 2014. Danny Elfman was hired to compose the film's score.

Fifty Shades of Grey premiered at the 65th Berlin International Film Festival on February 11, 2015, and was released in IMAX formats on February 13, by Universal Pictures. Despite receiving generally mixed reviews from critics, it was an immediate box office success, breaking numerous box office records and earning $569.7 million worldwide against a budget of $40 million. The soundtrack album was also successful; "Love Me like You Do", by English singer Ellie Goulding, was nominated for the Golden Globe Award for Best Original Song, while "Earned It", by Canadian singer the Weeknd, was nominated for the Academy Award for Best Original Song at the 88th Academy Awards. Fifty Shades of Grey was succeeded by two sequels: Fifty Shades Darker, and Fifty Shades Freed, released in 2017 and 2018, respectively, both of which received similar negative critical reception and commercial success.

== Plot ==
Twenty-one year old Anastasia "Ana" Steele is an English literature major at Washington State University Vancouver. Her roommate, Kate Kavanagh, catches a cold and is unable to interview Christian Grey, a twenty-seven year old billionaire entrepreneur, for the college newspaper. Ana agrees to take Kate's place.

At Christian's Seattle headquarters, Ana stumbles her way through the meeting. Christian, who is that year's WSU commencement speaker, takes an interest in her, which is mutual. Soon after, he visits the hardware store where Ana works and offers to do a photo shoot to accompany the article for which she had interviewed him.

Christian asks Ana out for coffee, but leaves abruptly after she confesses to being a romantic, saying he is not the man for her. He later sends her first edition copies of two Thomas Hardy novels, including Tess of the d'Urbervilles, as a gift, with a quote from the latter book about the dangers of relationships on an accompanying card.

Ana and her friends celebrate graduation at a local bar. After drinking too much, she calls Christian, saying she is returning the books, and berating him for his behavior towards her. He goes to the bar to find Ana, arriving just as her photographer friend, José Rodriguez, attempts to kiss her against her will. She is suddenly sick, throws up and passes out. The next morning, Ana wakes up in Christian's hotel room, relieved that nothing sexual happened between them.

After the two kiss passionately in an elevator, and Christian takes her for a ride in his helicopter, a romance starts to develop. He insists, however, that Ana sign a non-disclosure agreement preventing her from revealing details about their relationship. Christian explains that he is a dominant who engages in sexual bondage relationships, but only as defined in a contract between the participants.

Ana reveals that she is a virgin. She considers the agreement and negotiates her own terms. Then, after briefly visiting his "Red Room" which is stocked with a bed and a variety of whips and shackles, Ana and Christian spend the night together.

The next morning, after making pancakes and meeting Christian's adoptive mother, the two go for a drive. As the way, Christian explains he was introduced to his dominant practices at age 15 by a woman Ana dubs "Mrs. Robinson". His parents know nothing about this, even though "Mrs. Robinson" was and still is a friend of the family.

Christian bestows a series of gifts and favors upon Ana, including a new car and a laptop. After she and Kate move to Seattle, he insists that she go over his contract before moving forward. After looking into it in some detail, Ana initially says no, but is persuaded otherwise and finds herself willingly giving her consent.

During dinner at Christian's parents' home, Ana suddenly mentions she is leaving the next day to visit her mother in Georgia. This makes him angry, especially when she says she wants more than the one-sided relationship he is proposing. Ana then goes to Georgia, visits a cocktail lounge, and is shocked when Christian shows up. He introduces himself, takes Ana air gliding, then returns to Seattle to tend to a business emergency.

After returning home, Ana and Christian have a night in his "Red Room". She consents to what he wants, but he remains emotionally distant, upsetting her. While still considering the contract, and in an effort to understand Christian's psychology, Ana asks him to demonstrate the worst punishment he would inflict on her for rule-breaking. Christian whips her with his belt, making her count each stroke out loud.

Crushed, Ana declares her love for him, but says his behavior is unacceptable. Christian replies that he is too psychologically broken to have the relationship that she wants. Devastated and depressed, Ana leaves him, and he promises to send her a check for the old car he sold without her consent. When he follows her out to the elevator, Ana orders him to stop. Christian tries to plead with her, saying her name, and she cuts him off by saying his own name, turning his plea into a farewell as the elevator doors close.

== Cast ==
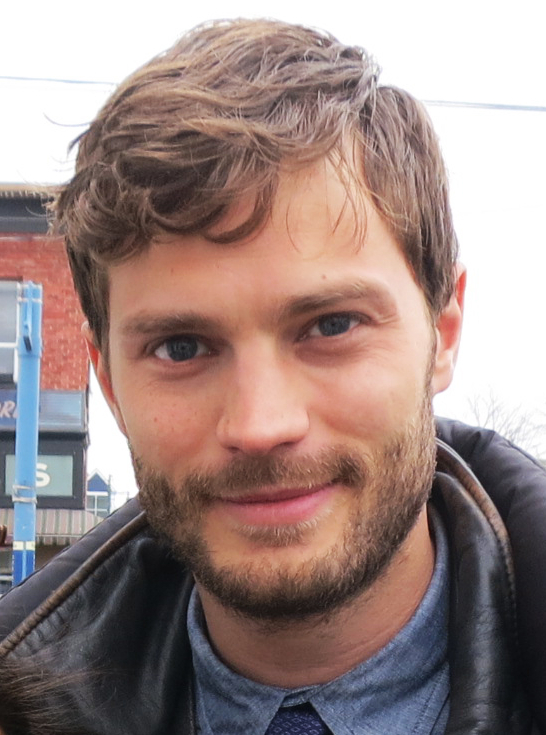
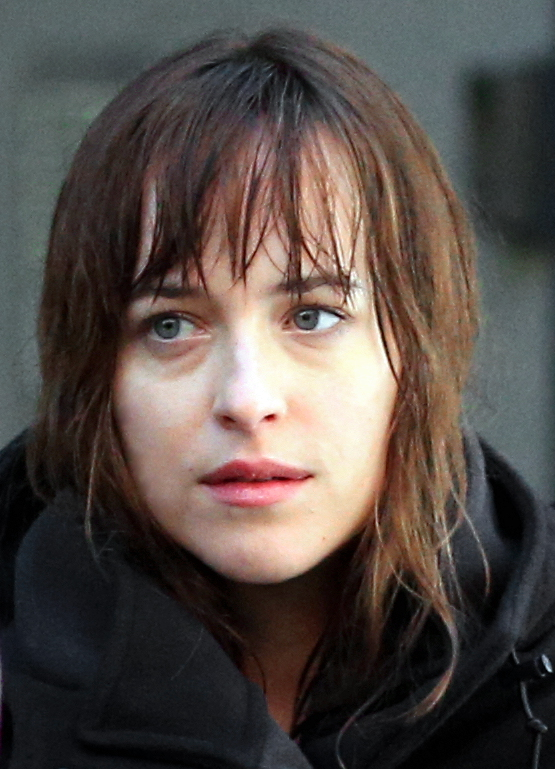
Jamie Dornan and Dakota Johnson.
- Dakota Johnson as Anastasia "Ana" Steele, a 21-year-old English Literature student attending Washington State University
- Jamie Dornan as Christian Grey, a 27-year-old billionaire, entrepreneur, and CEO of Grey Enterprises Holdings Inc. Charlie Hunnam was originally cast in the role, but left the film due to his schedule conflicts.
- Eloise Mumford as Katherine "Kate" Kavanagh, Anastasia's best friend/roommate who begins a relationship with Christian's older brother, Elliot Grey
- Jennifer Ehle as Carla Wilks, Anastasia's mother
- Marcia Gay Harden as Dr. Grace Trevelyan-Grey, Christian Grey's adoptive mother
- Victor Rasuk as José Rodriguez, one of Anastasia's close friends
- Luke Grimes as Elliot Grey, Christian's adopted older brother
- Rita Ora as Mia Grey, Christian's adopted younger sister
- Max Martini as Jason Taylor, Christian's bodyguard and head of his security
- Callum Keith Rennie as Ray Steele, Anastasia's father
- Andrew Airlie as Carrick Grey, Christian's adoptive father
- Dylan Neal as Bob Adams, Anastasia's stepfather
- Anthony Konechny as Paul Clayton, the brother of the owner of Clayton's Hardware Store
- Emily Fonda as Martina
- Rachel Skarsten as Andrea, Christian's assistant

== Production ==
=== Development ===
By early 2012, several Hollywood studios were keen to obtain film rights to The New York Times bestselling Fifty Shades trilogy of novels. Warner Bros., Sony, Paramount, Universal, and Mark Wahlberg's production company submitted bids for the film rights. Universal Pictures and Focus Features secured the rights to the trilogy in March 2012. Author James sought to retain some control during the movie's creative process. James chose The Social Network producers Michael De Luca and Dana Brunetti to produce the film.

Although American Psycho writer Bret Easton Ellis publicly expressed his desire to write the screenplay for Fifty Shades of Grey, Kelly Marcel, screenwriter of Saving Mr. Banks, was hired for the job. Patrick Marber was brought in by Taylor-Wood to polish the screenplay, specifically to do some "character work". Universal hired Mark Bomback for script doctoring. Mark Bridges served as the costume designer. Entertainment Weekly estimated the film's budget as "$40 million-or-so".

=== Direction ===
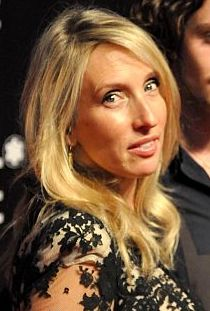
Director Sam Taylor-Johnson expressed that she found the novel's author E. L. James difficult to work with.

By May 9, 2013, the studio was considering Joe Wright to direct, but this proved unworkable due to Wright's schedule. Other directors who had been under consideration included Patty Jenkins, Bill Condon, Bennett Miller, and Steven Soderbergh. In June 2013, E. L. James announced Sam Taylor-Johnson would direct the film adaptation. Johnson was paid over US$2 million for directing the film.

9½ Weeks, Last Tango in Paris, and Blue Is the Warmest Colour were all cited by Taylor-Johnson as inspirations for the film.

In an interview in June 2017, Taylor-Johnson cited difficulties working with author E. L. James, causing her to leave the series. She said: "I can never say I regret it because that would just finish me off. With the benefit of hindsight would I go through it again? Of course I wouldn't. I'd be mad."

=== Casting ===
Bret Easton Ellis stated that Robert Pattinson had been James' first choice for the role of Christian Grey, but James felt that casting Pattinson and his Twilight co-star Kristen Stewart in the film would be "weird". Ian Somerhalder and Chace Crawford both expressed interest in the role of Christian. Somerhalder later admitted if he had been considered, the filming process would ultimately have conflicted with his shooting schedule for The CW's series The Vampire Diaries. On September 2, 2013, James revealed that Charlie Hunnam and Dakota Johnson had been cast as Christian Grey and Anastasia Steele, respectively. The short list of other actresses considered for the role of Anastasia included Alicia Vikander, Imogen Poots, Elizabeth Olsen, Shailene Woodley, and Felicity Jones. Keeley Hazell auditioned for an unspecified role. Lucy Hale also auditioned for the film. Emilia Clarke was also offered the role of Anastasia but turned down the part because of the nudity required. Taylor-Johnson would give every actress who auditioned for the role of Anastasia four pages to read of a monologue from Ingmar Bergman's Persona.

The studio originally wanted Ryan Gosling for Christian, but he was not interested in the role. Garrett Hedlund was also considered, but he could not connect with the character. Stephen Amell said he would not have wanted to play the role of Grey because "I actually didn't find him to be that interesting ... nothing about Christian Grey really spoke to me." Paul Walker was also considered for the role of Christian Grey, but died in a car accident in November 2013. Hunnam initially turned down the role of Christian but later reconsidered it, following a meeting with studio heads. Hunnam said of the audition process: "I felt really intrigued and excited about it so I went and read the first book to get a clearer idea of who this character was, and I felt even more excited at the prospect of bringing him to life. We [Taylor-Johnson and I] kind of both suggested I do a reading with Dakota, who was her favorite, and as soon as we got in the room and I started reading with Dakota I knew that I definitely wanted to do it. There's just like a tangible chemistry between us. It felt exciting and fun and weird and compelling." In response to the negative reaction that the casting drew from fans, producer Dana Brunetti said: "There is a lot that goes into casting that isn't just looks. Talent, availability, their desire to do it, chemistry with other actor, etc. So if your favorite wasn't cast, then it is most likely due to something on that list. Keep that in mind while hating and keep perspective."

During October 2013, actress Jennifer Ehle was in talks for the role of Anastasia's mother Carla. On October 12, 2013, Universal Pictures announced that Hunnam had exited the film due to conflicts with the schedule of his FX series Sons of Anarchy. Alexander Skarsgård, Jamie Dornan, Christian Cooke, Theo James, François Arnaud, Scott Eastwood, Luke Bracey, and Billy Magnussen were at the top of the list to replace Hunnam as Christian Grey. Finally, on October 23, 2013, Dornan was cast as Christian Grey. On October 31, 2013, Victor Rasuk was cast as José Rodriguez Jr. On November 22, 2013, Eloise Mumford was cast as Kate Kavanagh. On December 2, 2013, singer Rita Ora was cast as Christian's younger sister Mia. Ora originally wanted to work on the soundtrack. On December 3, 2013, Marcia Gay Harden was cast as Christian's mother, Grace.

=== Filming ===
In September, filming was scheduled to start on November 5, 2013, in Vancouver, British Columbia. The following month, producer Michael De Luca announced filming would begin on November 13, 2013. Principal photography was again delayed and eventually started on December 1, 2013. Scenes were filmed in the Gastown district of Vancouver. Bentall 5 was used as the Grey Enterprises building.

The University of British Columbia serves as Washington State University Vancouver, from which Ana graduates. The Fairmont Hotel Vancouver was used as the Heathman Hotel. The film was also shot at the North Shore Studios. The production officially ended on February 21, 2014. Reshoots involving scenes between Dornan and Johnson took place in Vancouver during the week of October 13, 2014. The film was shot under the working title "The Adventures of Max and Banks." Uncredited screenwriter Mark Bomback said he "had never been on a project with that much secrecy around it...The set was on lockdown".

The film was the last project worked on by prolific Academy Award-winning editor Anne V. Coates before her death in 2018.

In an alternative ending, both Ana and Christian experience flashbacks. Christian jogs in the rain, while Ana sobs in her apartment. Christian encounters a gift Ana gave him with the note: "This reminded me of a happy time. —Ana".

== Music ==
The film's soundtrack was released on February 10, 2015. "Earned It", by Canadian singer the Weeknd, was released as the lead single on December 24, 2014. The second single, "Love Me like You Do", by English singer Ellie Goulding, was released on January 7, 2015. Both singles reached number three of the Billboard Hot 100. The promotional single, "Salted Wound", by Australian singer Sia, was released on January 27, 2015.

As of May 2018, the soundtrack has sold 516,000 copies in the United States.

== Release ==
=== Theatrical ===
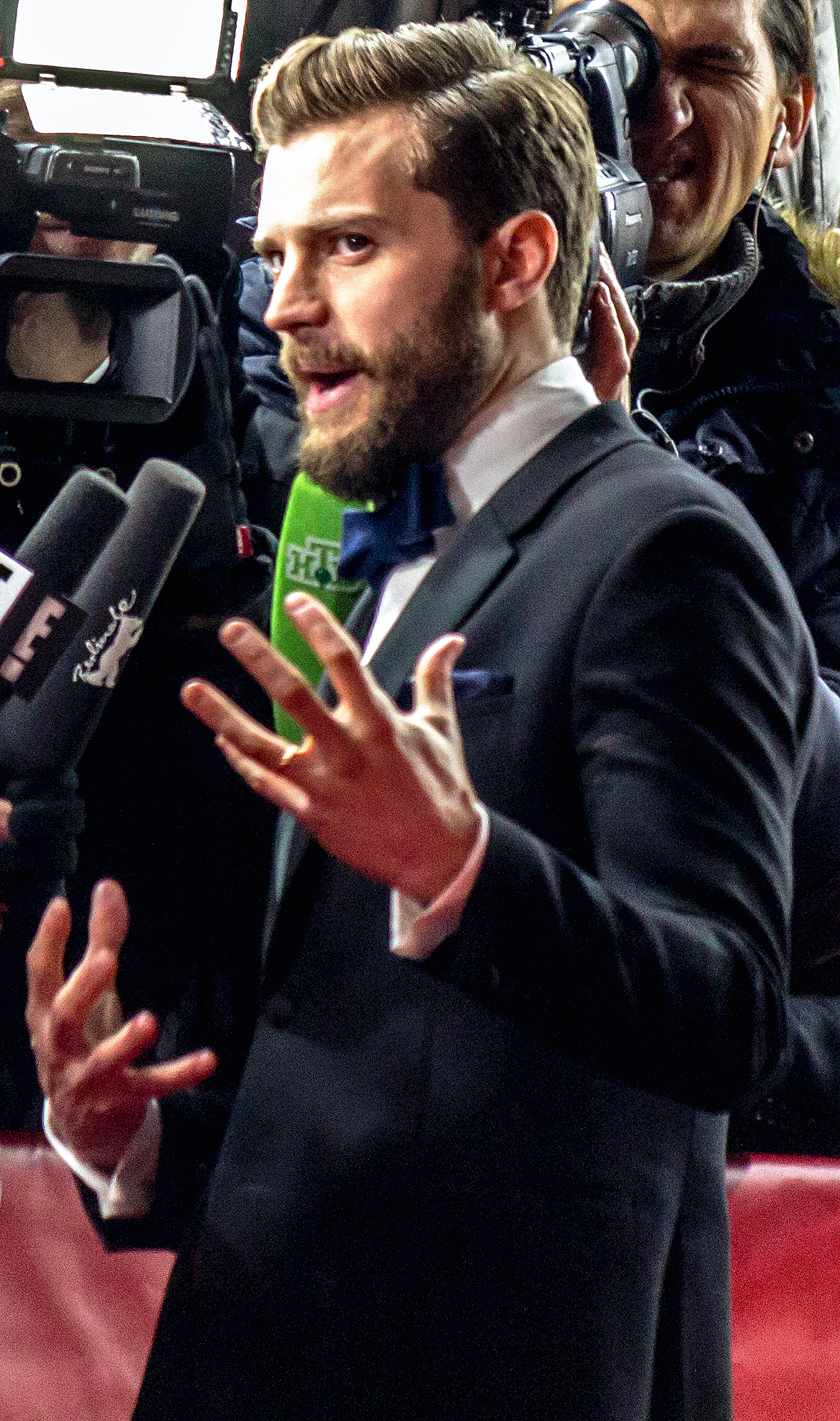
Jamie Dornan at the world premiere of Fifty Shades of Grey, Berlinale 2015

In February 2013, Universal chairman Adam Fogelson said the film "could be ready to release ... as early as next summer." The studio initially announced an August 1, 2014, release. However, in November 2013, it was pushed back to February 13, 2015, in time for Valentine's Day. Fifty Shades of Grey was first screened at the 65th Berlin International Film Festival on February 11, 2015. The film was released in 75 IMAX screens across the US on February 13, 2015.

=== Marketing ===
On January 25, 2014, more than a year prior to release, Universal displayed posters with the phrase, "Mr. Grey will see you now", in five locations across the United States.

On July 9, 2014, the book's author, E. L. James, said on Twitter that the film's trailer would be released on July 24, 2014. Beyoncé debuted a teaser for the trailer on her Instagram account five days before the trailer's release. On July 24, Dornan and Johnson were on The Today Show to present part of the trailer appropriate for morning television; the full trailer, which contained more racy scenes, was released later the same day on the internet (200 days before its initial theatrical release). The trailer featured a new version of "Crazy in Love" by Beyoncé, which was scored and arranged by her frequent collaborator Boots. The trailer was viewed 36.4 million times in the week after its July 24 release. This made it the most viewed trailer on YouTube in 2014, until it was surpassed in October by the trailer for Avengers: Age of Ultron. However, in mid-December the trailer reached 93 million views and was again the most viewed of 2014. The trailer accumulated over 100 million views in its first week of release through different channels and websites, becoming the biggest trailer ever released in history. By February 2015, the trailer had been viewed more than 193 million times on YouTube alone. And, by late February, Fifty Shades of Grey–related material garnered over 329 million views, including 113 million views for its official trailer. A second trailer was released on November 13, 2014. A third trailer aired during Super Bowl XLIX, on February 1, 2015.

The film was promoted through an ad campaign that asked people whether they were "curious". Nick Carpou, Universal's president of domestic distribution, said: "Our campaign gave people permission to see the film." "Valentines is a big deal for couples and a great relationship event, and the date with the long Presidents Day weekend created a perfect storm for us. This date positioned us to take full advantage of the romance angle, which is how we sold the film in our marketing campaign," he said.

=== Rating and censorship ===
There was initial speculation that the film could receive an NC-17 rating in the United States. Studios typically steer away from the adults-only rating due to the impact the classification has on a film's commercial viability, with some theater chains refusing to exhibit NC-17-rated films. While screenwriter Marcel said she expected the film to be NC-17-rated, producer De Luca anticipated the less restrictive R rating. On January 5, 2015, the MPAA did give the film an R rating, basing its decision on "strong sexual content including dialogue, some unusual behavior and graphic nudity, and language."

On January 30, in Australia, the film was rated MA15+ by the ACB for "strong sex scenes, sexual themes and nudity". On February 2, 2015, the British BBFC classified the film an 18 certificate, mentioning "strong sex". In Canada, Ontario, Manitoba, Alberta, and British Columbia, the film was rated at 18A by the OFRB, MFCB, AFR, and BCFCO, respectively, due to its "occasional upsetting or disturbing scenes, and partial or full nudity in a brief sexual situation." In Quebec, the Régie du cinéma rated the movie under the 16+ category for its eroticism. In France, the film earned a 12 rating. In Lebanon, the film earned an NC-21 rating. In Argentina, the Advisory Commission of Cinematographic Exhibition (the rating arm of the INCAA) rated the film SAM16/R. In Mexico, the film earned a C rating, which is equivalent to that no person under the age of 18 could enter to see the feature film for any reason.

Conservative anti-pornography watchdog group Morality in Media argued that the film's R rating "severely undermines the violent themes in the film and does not adequately inform parents and patrons of the film's content", and that the MPAA was encouraging sexual violence by allowing the films to be shown without an NC-17 rating.

The film was scheduled for a February 12, 2015, release in Malaysia, but it was denied a certificate by the Malaysian Film Censorship Board (LPF) for its "unnatural" and "sadistic" content. The LPF chairman, Abdul Halim Abdul Hamid, said Fifty Shades was "more pornography than a movie". The film was also banned in Indonesia, Kenya, Russia's North Caucasus, the United Arab Emirates (UAE), Papua New Guinea, Cambodia, and India. The film was released in Nigeria for a week, before being removed from cinemas by the National Film and Video Censors Board (NFVCB). Studios decided against pursuing a theatrical release in China.

The sex scenes were censored after protests from various religious groups in the Philippines, and as a result it is in limited release in that country with an R-18 rating from the MTRCB. A similarly cut version was released in Zimbabwe.

Roughly 20 minutes were cut from the film for screening in Vietnam, leaving no sex scenes. The scene in which Ana is beaten with a belt is skipped entirely.

=== Opposition campaign ===
On February 2, in Michigan, a man petitioned to halt the film's release at a local Celebration! Cinema. Despite the man's efforts, the president of the cinemas declined to cancel the release of the film. He said, "We've been in business for 70 years and people often times object to content, and it's not our job to censor the content of a widespread movie. It's not in our best interest. It's not in the community's best interest." The film sold 3,000 tickets before the release and was expected to sell a total of 10,000 tickets.

Thomas Williams of the Notre Dame Center for Ethics and Culture commented on the release of the film in the United States on Valentine's Day, stating "The irony of Universal Pictures' decision to release its bondage-erotica film Fifty Shades of Grey on the day dedicated to honoring a Christian martyr has not gone unnoticed to many observers, who seem to find the choice unclassy at best."

=== Home media ===
Fifty Shades of Grey was released via DVD and Blu-ray on May 8, 2015. The Blu-ray edition features an unrated cut of the film; the version includes an additional three minutes of footage, the bulk of which are in the form of an alternative ending.

Upon its release on home media in the U.S., the film topped both the Nielsen VideoScan First Alert chart, which tracks combined Blu-ray Disc and DVD sales, as well as the Blu-ray Disc sales chart for two consecutive weeks up to the week ending May 17, 2015.

== Reception ==
=== Box office ===
Fifty Shades of Grey grossed $166.2 million in the United States and Canada and $403.5 million in other countries, for a worldwide total of $569.7 million, against a budget of $40 million. It became the third highest-grossing film directed by a woman at the time of release (behind Mamma Mia! and Kung Fu Panda 2), and at the time of the end of its theatrical run, it was the fourth-highest-grossing R-rated film of all time (behind The Hangover Part II, The Passion of the Christ, and The Matrix Reloaded). Deadline Hollywood calculated the net profit of the film to be $256.55 million, when factoring together all expenses and revenues for the film.

Tickets went on sale in the United States from January 11, 2015. According to ticket-selling site Fandango, Fifty Shades of Grey is the fastest-selling R-rated title in the site's 15-year history, surpassing Sex and the City 2. It also had the biggest first week of ticket sales on Fandango for a non-sequel film, surpassing 2012's The Hunger Games. It is fourth overall on Fandango's list of top advance ticket sales behind The Twilight Saga: New Moon, Harry Potter and the Deathly Hallows – Part 2, and The Hunger Games. The demand prompted US theater owners to add new showtimes. Weeks before the film's release, several box office analysts suggested as much as a $60 million domestic four-day opening while Box Office Mojo reported that a $100 million opening could be possible.

Outside the United States, Fifty Shades of Grey pre-sold 4.5 million tickets in 39 markets. In the UK, it sold £1.3 million (US$1.9 million) worth of tickets a week before release. On release, it set several records at the box office, including:

Box office record	Record details	Previous record holder	Previous record holder details	Ref.
February opening weekend	US$85,171,450	The Passion of the Christ	(2004, US$83.8 million)	
President's Day 4-Day opening weekend for any film	US$93,010,350	Valentine's Day	(2010, US$63.1 million)	
President's Day 4-Day weekend for any film	US$93,010,350	Valentine's Day	(2010, US$63.1 million)	
Widest R-rated opening	3,646 theaters	The Hangover Part II	(2011, 3,615 theaters)	
Valentine's Day gross	US$36,752,460	Valentine's Day	(2010, US$23,392,046)	
Opening weekend for a female directed film	US$85,171,450	Twilight	(2008, U$69,637,740)	
Overseas opening weekend for an R-rated film	US$156 million	The Matrix Revolutions	(2003, US$117 million)	
Highest-grossing Universal's R-rated film overseas	US$385.1 million	Ted	(2012, US$330 million)	

==== United States and Canada ====
In the US and Canada, it is the highest-grossing sex film, the seventeenth-highest-grossing film of 2015, and the fourth-highest-grossing romantic film of all time. It opened in the US and Canada simultaneously with Kingsman: The Secret Service on Thursday, February 12, 2015, across 2,830 theaters and was widened to 3,646 theaters the next day making it the widest R-rated opening (surpassed by Mad Max: Fury Road), and the fourth-widest R-rated release of all time. It earned $8.6 million from Thursday night previews which is the second-highest late-night gross for a film released in February (behind Deadpool) and the third-highest for an R-rated film (behind Deadpool and The Hangover Part II). The film topped the box office on its opening day grossing $30.2 million (including Thursday previews) from 3,646 theaters setting a record for highest February opening day (previously held by The Passion of the Christ) and fourth-highest overall among R-rated films. During its traditional three-day opening the film opened at No. 1 at the box office earning $85.1 million, setting records for the biggest opening weekend for a film released in February (a record previously held by The Passion of the Christ). Women comprised 82% of the total audiences during its opening day, and 68% on Valentine's Day.

Revenue from the second weekend dropped massively by 73.9% to $22.25 million, which is the second-biggest drop for a 3,000-plus-screen release (only behind Friday the 13th's 80.4% drop) and the biggest for a 3,500-plus-screen release. It is just the eighth film to open on more than 3,000 screens to drop by 70% or more. The film topped the box office for two consecutive weekends before falling to No. 4 in its third weekend while Focus took the top spot.

==== Other countries ====
Outside the US and Canada, box-office analysts were predicting as much as $158 million opening. It opened Wednesday, February 11, 2015, in four countries, earning $3.7 million. It opened in 34 more countries on February 12, earning $28.6 million in two days. The film set opening-day records for Universal Pictures in 25 markets and opening day records for an R-rated film in 34 territories. Through Sunday, February 15, it earned an opening-weekend total of US$156 million from 58 countries from 10,979 screens (US$173.6 million through Monday) where it opened at No. 1 in 54 of the 58 countries, marking the biggest overseas opening for an R-rated film, the fourth-biggest of 2015, and Universal's third-biggest overseas opening weekend ever. The film set an all-time opening record in 13 markets, Universal's biggest opening weekend ever in 30 markets and biggest opening for any R-rated film in 31 markets.

The biggest opener outside of the United States was witnessed in the UK, Ireland and Malta, where it earned £13.55 million (US$20.8 million) in its opening weekend, which is the biggest debut ever for an 18-rated film and the second-biggest for a non-sequel film (behind I Am Legend). In just 10 days of release it became the highest-grossing 18-rated film of all time. It topped the UK box office for two consecutive weekends. Other high openings include Germany (US$14.1 million), France (US$12.3 million), Russia (US$11 million), Italy (US$10.1 million), Spain (US$8.7 million), Brazil (US$8.3 million), Mexico (US$8.1 million), Australia (US$8 million). In Japan, the film was unsuccessful opening at No. 5 with $682,000 but falling out of the top 10 the following week. The Hollywood Reporter cited out possible reasons for the film's failure, attributing it to the "delayed release of the new Japanese-language editions of the books, poor timing for the film release and an R-15, re-edit blurring out parts of the sex scenes."

It topped the box office outside of the US for three consecutive weekends until it was overtaken by Warner Bros.' Jupiter Ascending in its fourth weekend. It became Universal Pictures' highest-grossing R-rated film of all time overseas (breaking Ted's record), Universal Pictures' highest-grossing film in 14 countries, (Note: It is Universal Pictures' highest-grossing film of all time in Brazil, Denmark, Italy, Poland, Venezuela, Croatia, Czech Republic, Estonia, Paraguay, Romania, Serbia/Montenegro, Slovakia, Slovenia and Ukraine.) and Universal Pictures' eighth-highest-grossing film overseas. In total earnings, its largest markets overseas are the UK, Ireland and Malta (US$52.5 million), Germany (US$43.7 million), Brazil (US$31.3 million), France (US$29.5 million), and Spain (US$22.6 million).

=== Critical response ===
Fifty Shades of Grey received mixed reviews, with criticism of its acting, screenplay, and pacing; some critics considered it an improvement over the book, and others praised its cinematography, production design and soundtrack. On Rotten Tomatoes the film has a 25% approval rating, with an average rating of 4.20/10 based on 279 reviews. The website's critical consensus reads, "While creatively better endowed than its print counterpart, Fifty Shades of Grey is a less than satisfying experience on the screen." Metacritic gave the film a score of 46 out of 100, based on reviews from 46 critics, indicating "mixed or average" reviews. In CinemaScore polls conducted during the opening weekend, cinema audiences gave the film an average grade of "C+" on an A+ to F scale.

Claudia Puig of USA Today wrote that "the dialogue is laughable, the pacing is sluggish and the performances are one-note." Moira Macdonald of The Seattle Times wrote: "Fifty Shades of Grey the movie, for the record, is not quite as bad as Fifty Shades of Grey the book. But that's not saying much". We Got This Covered critic Isaac Feldberg gave the film one and a half stars out of five and wrote that it "feels like two, distinct films grappling for dominance over the screen: one a sensual and stylish romance, and the other a numbingly explicit Harlequin bodice-ripper brought to life. Regrettably, the latter and lesser of the two ends up on top". The Guardian lead film critic Peter Bradshaw gave the film one star out of five, calling it "the most purely tasteful and softcore depiction of sadomasochism in cinema history" with "strictly daytime soap" performances. A. O. Scott of The New York Times called the film "terrible", but wrote that "it might nonetheless be a movie that feels good to see, whether you squirm or giggle or roll your eyes or just sit still and take your punishment."

In a positive review for The Daily Telegraph, Robbie Collin called the film "sexy, funny and self-aware in every way the original book isn't." Elizabeth Weitzman of New York's Daily News praised the directing, screenplay, and Johnson's performance, but called Dornan's performance, the leads' chemistry, and the supporting cast "underused". She praised the film for honoring the essence of its source and the director's way of balancing "atmosphere with action". In The Guardian, Jordan Hoffmann awarded the film three out of five stars, writing, "this big screen adaptation still manages to be about people, and even a little bit sweet", and that the sex scenes "are there to advance the plot, and only the most buttoned-up prude will be scandalised." Lisa Schwarzbaum of Entertainment Weekly gave the film a B−, writing: "This perfectly normal way of consuming erotica suggests that the movie Fifty Shades of Grey will work better as home entertainment, when each viewer can race past the blah-blah about how well Christian plays the piano and pause on the fleeting image of the man minus his pants." In The Sydney Morning Herald, Timothy Laurie and Jessica Kean argue that "the film provides a language for decision-making around violence more developed than most Hollywood fodder", and that "film fleshes out an otherwise legalistic concept like 'consent' into a living, breathing, and at times, uncomfortable interpersonal experience. It dramatises the dangers of unequal negotiation and the practical complexity of identifying one's limits and having them respected."

Various critics noted similarities between Fifty Shades of Grey and Adrian Lyne's 9½ Weeks (1986). Both films are literary adaptations, centering on a sadomasochistic affair.

=== Accolades ===
The film was the most awarded at the 36th Golden Raspberry Awards, winning five of six nominations, including Worst Picture (tied with Fantastic Four) and both leading roles.

== Pornographic-adaptation lawsuit ==
In June 2012, the film company Smash Pictures announced its intent to film a pornographic version of the Fifty Shades book trilogy, entitled Fifty Shades of Grey: An XXX Adaptation. A release date of January 10, 2013 was announced. In November 2012, Universal, which had secured the Fifty Shades film rights, filed a lawsuit against Smash Pictures, stating that the film violated its copyright in that it was not filmed as a parody adaptation but "copies without reservation from the unique expressive elements of the Fifty Shades trilogy, progressing through the events of Fifty Shades of Grey and into the second book, Fifty Shades Darker".

The lawsuit asked for an injunction, for the profits from all sales of the film, as well as damages, saying that "a quickly and cheaply produced pornographic work [...] is likely to cause Plaintiffs irreparable harm by poisoning public perception of the Fifty Shades Trilogy and the forthcoming Universal films." Smash Pictures responded to the lawsuit by issuing a counterclaim and requesting a continuance, stating that "much or all" of the Fifty Shades material was part of the public domain because it was originally published in various venues as a fan fiction based on the Twilight series. A lawyer for Smash Pictures further commented that the federal copyright registrations for the books were "invalid and unenforceable" and that the film "did not violate copyright or trademark laws". The lawsuit was eventually settled out of court for an undisclosed sum and Smash Pictures agreed to stop any further production or promotion of the film.

== Sequels ==
In April 2015, The Hollywood Reporter reported that E. L. James' husband, Niall Leonard, was enlisted to write the script for the film's sequel. In the same month, at the 2015 Universal CinemaCon in Las Vegas, Universal announced the release dates of the sequels, with Fifty Shades Darker being released on February 10, 2017, and Fifty Shades Freed was released on February 9, 2018. However, the sequels did not see Sam Taylor-Johnson returning as director. On August 20, 2015, the U.S. House of Cards director James Foley was a frontrunner to direct the sequel. In November 2015, Universal Studios announced that the films would be shot back-to-back.

== Parody ==
A spoof version of the film, Fifty Shades of Black, was released on January 29, 2016, in North America. Marlon Wayans and Rick Alvarez wrote the script, in which Wayans stars as Christian Black. The film was distributed by SquareOne Entertainment in Germany and Open Road Films in the United States; IM Global produce and finance it, as well as handling international releases. Kali Hawk parodied the role of Anastasia Steele, with supporting cast including Affion Crockett, Mike Epps, Jane Seymour, Andrew Bachelor and Fred Willard. It was released theatrically on January 29, 2016, and described as less funny "than the unintentionally-funny film it's trying to lampoon."

== See also ==
- 9½ Weeks, 1986 film
- Sex in film
- Wild Orchid (film), 1989
