= E. L. James =

British author (born 1963)

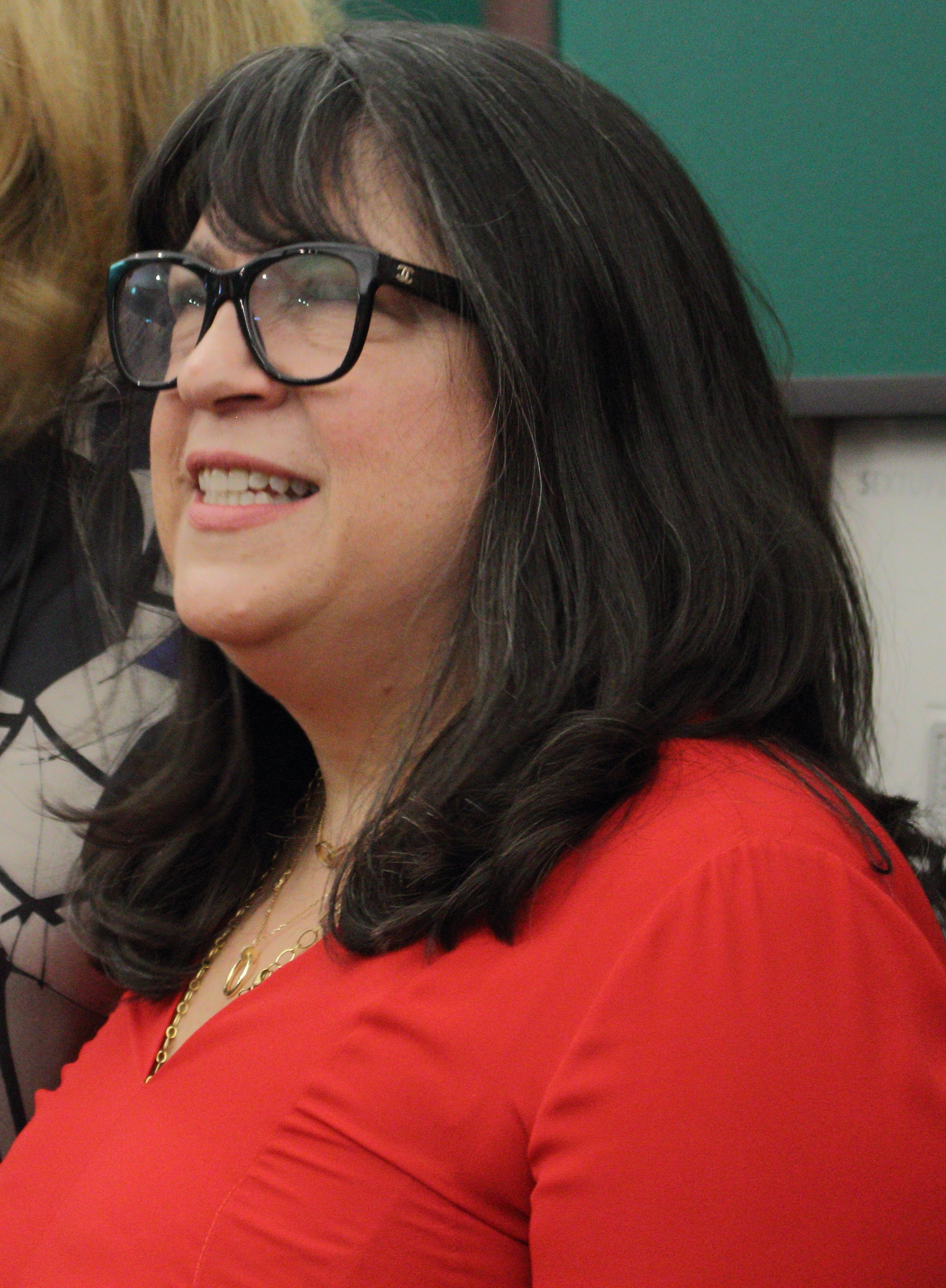
- James at the 2019 London Book Fair
- Born: Erika Mitchell; 7 March 1963 (age 63); Willesden, London, England
- Education: Wycombe High School
- Alma mater: University of Kent
- Occupation: Author
- Spouse: Niall Leonard (m. 1987)
- Children: 2
- Writing career
- Pen name: E. L. James; Snowqueens Icedragon
- Years active: 2011–present
- Genres: Romance, erotica, fan fiction
- Website: eljamesauthor.com

Erika Mitchell (born 7 March 1963), known by her pen name E. L. James, is a British author. She wrote the best-selling Fifty Shades series of erotic romance novels, which spawned a multimedia franchise including a film trilogy of the same name. Prior to this, she wrote the Twilight fan fiction "Master of the Universe" that served as the basis for the Fifty Shades series under the web name Snowqueens Icedragon. In 2019, she published her first book unconnected with the fictional world of Fifty Shades, The Mister, to negative critical reaction.

The Fifty Shades novels have sold over 150 million copies worldwide, over 35 million copies in the United States and set the record in the United Kingdom as the fastest selling paperback of all time. In 2012, Time magazine named her one of "The World's 100 Most Influential People".

== Early life ==
Erika Mitchell was born on 7 March 1963, in Willesden, to a Chilean mother and a Scottish father who was a BBC cameraman. She was brought up in Buckinghamshire.

James was educated at the independent Pipers Corner School and at Wycombe High School, a state grammar school for girls in the town of High Wycombe in Buckinghamshire, followed by the University of Kent in South East England where she studied history.

After leaving university, James became a studio manager's assistant at the National Film and Television School in Beaconsfield.

== Career ==
James says the idea for the Fifty Shades trilogy began as a response to the vampire novel series Twilight. In late 2008, James saw the movie Twilight, and then became intensely absorbed with the novels that the movie was based on. She read the novels several times over in a period of a few days and then set out to write a sequel to the books. Between January and August 2009, she wrote two such books in quick succession. She says she then discovered the phenomenon of fan fiction, and this inspired her to publish her novels as Kindle books under the pen name "Snowqueens Icedragon". Beginning in August 2009, she then began to write the Fifty Shades books.

James has spoken of her shock at the success of the books. "The explosion of interest has taken me completely by surprise", she said. James has described the Fifty Shades trilogy as "my midlife crisis, writ large. All my fantasies in there, and that's it." She did not start to write until January 2009, as she revealed while still active on FanFiction.Net: "I started writing in January 2009 after I finished the Twilight saga, and I haven't stopped since. I discovered Fan Fiction in August 2009. Since then I have written my two fics and plan on doing at least one more. After that ... who knows?"

In August 2013, James topped the Forbes' list of the highest-earning authors due to her book sales with earnings of US$95 million which included US$5 million for the film rights to Fifty Shades of Grey.

== Personal life ==
James married Niall Leonard, a novelist and screenwriter from Northern Ireland, in 1987. They have two sons. As of 2012, they live in Brentford, west London.

== Awards and honours ==
Award or honour	Year	Nominated work	Ref
The Top 100 Most Influential People in the World	2012	Fifty Shades of Grey	
Publishing Person of the Year	2012	Fifty Shades of Grey	
Popular Fiction Book of the Year	2012	Fifty Shades of Grey	
Book of the Year	2012	Fifty Shades of Grey	
Golden Raspberry Award for Worst Picture	2016	Fifty Shades of Grey	
Golden Raspberry Award for Worst Screenplay	2016	Fifty Shades of Grey	
Golden Raspberry Award for Worst Remake, Rip-off, or Sequel	2018	Fifty Shades Darker	
Golden Raspberry Award for Worst Screenplay	2019	Fifty Shades Freed	

== Published works ==
=== Fifty Shades trilogy ===
- Fifty Shades of Grey (2011)
- Fifty Shades Darker (2012)
- Fifty Shades Freed (2012)

=== Fifty Shades as Told by Christian trilogy ===
- Grey: Fifty Shades of Grey as Told by Christian (2015)
- Darker: Fifty Shades Darker as Told by Christian (2017)
- Freed: Fifty Shades Freed as Told by Christian (2021)

=== Mister and Missus duology ===
- The Mister (2019)
- The Missus (2023)

=== Land of Ghosts series ===
- Land of Ghosts (2026)
- Land of Dreams (2027)

== Filmography ==
Year	Title	Note(s)
2015	Fifty Shades of Grey	Producer and Cameo
2017	Fifty Shades Darker	Producer
2018	Fifty Shades Freed	Producer
2018	Book Club	Cameo
