= Freed: Fifty Shades Freed as Told by Christian =

Erotic romance by British author, E. L. James

Freed: Fifty Shades Freed As Told by Christian
- Author: E. L. James
- Language: English
- Series: Fifty Shades trilogy
- Genre: Erotic romance
- Published: 1 June 2021
- Publication place: United Kingdom
- ISBN: 978-1728251035
- Preceded by: Darker: Fifty Shades Darker as Told by Christian

Freed: Fifty Shades Freed As Told By Christian is the sixth book in the Fifty Shades series by E. L. James and was released on 1 June 2021 (ISBN 978-1728251035). It tells the story of Fifty Shades Freed from Christian Grey's perspective like the previous two novels in this series.
