= Grey: Fifty Shades of Grey as Told by Christian =

Novel by E. L. James

Grey: Fifty Shades of Grey As Told by Christian
- Author: E. L. James
- Language: English
- Series: Fifty Shades trilogy
- Genre: Erotic romance
- Published: 18 June 2015
- Publisher: Vintage
- Publication place: United Kingdom
- Media type: Print, e-book, audiobook
- Pages: 576 pages
- ISBN: 1101946342
- Preceded by: Fifty Shades Freed
- Followed by: Darker: Fifty Shades Darker as Told by Christian

Grey: Fifty Shades of Grey As Told by Christian, also referred to as Grey, is a 2015 erotic romance by British author E. L. James. It is the fourth installment in the Fifty Shades series, which had its start as fanfiction.

The novel was released on 18 June 2015 to coincide with the birth date of the character Christian Grey. The work's first printing run consisted of 1.25 million copies.

== Summary ==
Christian Grey, a successful and rich 27-year-old businessman, meets 21-year-old university student Anastasia "Ana" Steele when she interviews him on behalf of her friend/roommate Katherine "Kate" Kavanagh (being sick with the flu at the time) for the university newspaper. The characters develop an attraction for each other and Christian proposes a sadomasochistic relationship with Ana.

Christian hopes that his relationship with Ana will relieve the effects of a traumatic childhood, but his dark sexual proclivities and self-loathing drive Ana away. Ana is initially naive about Christian's sadism and the power dynamics in their relationship but as the novel progresses she comes to understand that his behaviour is cold and controlling.

== Development ==
On 1 June 2015 James announced that she was in the process of writing another book in the Fifty Shades series due to popular demand from her fanbase. Later that same day she posted an image on her Instagram account that confirmed that the novel would be titled Grey, that it would be told from the perspective of Christian Grey, and that she had deliberately chosen its publication date in order to coincide with Grey's birthday. Pre-order sales for Grey were extremely strong, which led many retailers to order large quantities of the book in order to meet release day demand. An editor for The Bookseller also commented that Grey could become the "biggest book of the year".

On 11 June 2015 Random House reported that a finished copy of Grey had been stolen and that the theft was being investigated by Kent police. The theft, which occurred on 8 June, has been compared to the 2008 leak of Stephenie Meyer's Midnight Sun, a then-unreleased companion novel that retells the events of Twilight from the perspective of Edward Cullen. Whereas the leak of Midnight Sun caused Meyer to put the work on hold until 2020, James stated that Grey would be released as scheduled.

== Reception ==
=== Press ===
Critical reception for Grey has been generally negative and many critics have criticized it for being too similar to Fifty Shades of Grey. The Independent criticized the book and the choice to include Grey's internal monologues, stating that he had a "vacuous mental life" and that "[T]he effect is increasingly comical – Mills & Boon meets Peep Show – while the rest of his internal monologue is spent stating the bleeding obvious." The Telegraph wrote a scathing review where they called it "as sexy as a misery memoir and as arousing as the diary of a sex offender" and wrote "[I]t's hard to work out what Ms Steele sees in him – even if you try to imagine him as Jamie Dornan, it's Jamie Dornan as the serial killer in The Fall." The Guardian remarked on the book, stating that while the first book was "a rather fun and fairly mild portrait of a woman's sexual fantasy", that "[I]nstead of lighthearted and repetitive mild S&M, the 'love affair' is now the twisted work of an utter psychopath." In the US, The Washington Post also found little of the original series in the rewrite: "Where Ana had bizarre quirks, a perplexing 'inner goddess' who was an Olympic-caliber backflipper, and a general sense of naïve wonder that lightened Fifty Shades and reminded readers not to take the story too seriously, there is none of that here. Grey is dark and unrelenting and far too serious, like Mr. Grey."

=== Audience ===
Fan reception for Grey has been positive and the book sold over 1 million copies in its first week of release.
