= Michael De Luca =

American film producer

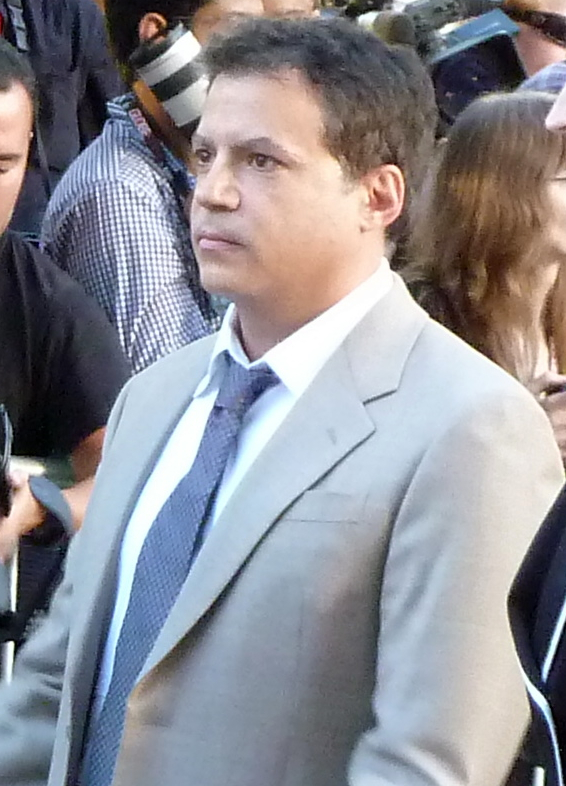
- De Luca at the 2011 Toronto; International Film Festival
- Born: August 13, 1965 (age 61); Brooklyn, New York, U.S.
- Education: New York University (BFA)
- Occupations: Executive, writer, producer
- Employer: Warner Bros. Discovery (2022–2026)
- Title: Former Co-Chair and CEO, Warner Bros. Motion Picture Group
- Spouse: Angelique Madrid (m. 2009)
- Children: 2

Michael De Luca (born August 13, 1965) is an American film executive, writer, and film producer. He formerly served as the president of New Line Cinema, head of production of DreamWorks Pictures, chairman of Metro-Goldwyn-Mayer, and co-chair and CEO of Warner Bros. Pictures along with Pamela Abdy.

== Early life ==
De Luca was born and raised in Brooklyn, New York. His mother was a German-Jewish immigrant, and his father, who was Italian American and Catholic, worked at ConEdison. De Luca began pursuing a career in show business and joined New Line Cinema as an intern while attending New York University's Tisch School of the Arts. In 1986, he accepted a full-time position at New Line as a story editor. De Luca completed his degree from Tisch School of the Arts in 1995.

== Career ==
De Luca received his first credit in 1988, working as a writer on the television series Freddy's Nightmares. In 1990, De Luca made his debut in the film industry as an associate producer on Leatherface: The Texas Chainsaw Massacre III, which was quickly followed by his writing/producing role on the 1991 film Freddy's Dead: The Final Nightmare. He also worked as a writer in the three seasons of the 1991–93 television series Dark Justice.

De Luca became the President and COO for New Line Cinema in October 1993. During his tenure at New Line Cinema, he oversaw a variety of films that would come to define the studio, including Seven, Friday, Boogie Nights, Austin Powers, Rush Hour, Blade, American History X, and Magnolia. Additionally, De Luca wrote the 1994 film In the Mouth of Madness, directed by John Carpenter, and co-wrote the story for the 1995 film adaptation of the popular British comic book character Judge Dredd, starring Sylvester Stallone as the eponymous lead. In 1996, De Luca was approached by producers Brannon Braga and Ronald D. Moore of the television series Star Trek: Voyager and pitched an idea which turned into an opportunity to write an episode for the series, "Threshold". De Luca left the company in January 2001.

After New Line Cinema, De Luca became Head of Production at DreamWorks Pictures, his tenure lasting from June 2001 to June 2004.

After leaving DreamWorks, De Luca began a three-year first-look deal as a producer with Sony Pictures in July 2004 and started his own production company, Michael De Luca Productions. His first release under his production company was Ghost Rider (2007), starring Nicolas Cage, followed by 21 and The Love Guru (both 2008) starring Mike Myers.

He was nominated for the Best Picture Oscar two years in a row for The Social Network (2010) and Moneyball (2011). He received a third nomination in 2014 for producing Captain Phillips by Paul Greengrass.

De Luca also produced the 2011 remake of the cult classic vampire horror film Fright Night. De Luca and Dana Brunetti reunited for Fifty Shades of Grey, the 2015 film adaptation of the best-selling novel of the same name. It was a massive financial success, becoming one of the highest-grossing R-rated films of all time.

On January 3, 2020, it was announced that De Luca had been appointed Chairman of the MGM Motion Picture Group. In July 2022, he and Pamela Abdy left MGM for Warner Bros. Pictures Group, becoming co-chairs and CEO of Warner Bros. Motion Picture Group.

On October 2, 2026, it was announced that De Luca and Pamela Abdy would be exiting Warner Bros. after the close of the Paramount and Warner Bros. merger. The merger closed on October 6, 2026.

== Personal life ==
De Luca was previously in a relationship with actress Julianne Moore, star of New Line's Boogie Nights.

In 2009, he married actress Angelique Madrid (born 1974) from Ft. Worth, Texas; she had been a contestant on the first season of ABC's The Bachelor. They have two children.

== Filmography ==
=== Film ===
Executive producer

- Leatherface: The Texas Chainsaw Massacre III (1990)
- Freddy's Dead: The Final Nightmare (1991)
- The Mask (1994)
- Don Juan DeMarco (1994)
- In the Mouth of Madness (1994)
- Last Man Standing (1996)
- The Long Kiss Goodnight (1996)
- B.A.P.S. (1997)
- Wag the Dog (1997)
- Dark City (1998)
- Lost in Space (1998)
- Blade (1998) (Uncredited)
- Pleasantville (1998)
- Austin Powers: The Spy Who Shagged Me (1999)
- Detroit Rock City (1999)
- Body Shots (1999)
- The Bachelor (1999)
- Magnolia (1999)
- Lost Souls (2000)
- Little Nicky (2000)
- Thirteen Days (2000)
- Hedwig and the Angry Inch (2001)
- Blow (2001)
- Town & Country (2001)
- Storytelling (2001)
- Rush Hour 2 (2001)
- Knockaround Guys (2001)
- Life as a House (2001)
- I Am Sam (2001)
- Run Ronnie Run! (2002)
- John Q. (2002)
- Blade II (2002)
- Highway (2002)
- Unconditional Love (2002)
- Simone (2002)
- A Man Apart (2003)
- The Lord of the Rings: The Hunt for Gollum (2027)

Co-executive producer

- Deep Cover (1992)
- Loaded Weapon 1 (1993)
- One Night Stand (1997)
- Boogie Nights (1997)
- American History X (1998)

Producer

- Zathura: A Space Adventure (2005)
- Ghost Rider (2007)
- 21 (2008)
- The Love Guru (2008)
- Brothers (2009)
- The Social Network (2010)
- Drive Angry (2011)
- Priest (2011)
- Fright Night (2011)
- Butter (2011)
- Moneyball (2011)
- The Sitter (2011)
- Ghost Rider: Spirit of Vengeance (2011)
- Captain Phillips (2013)
- Dracula Untold (2014)
- Fifty Shades of Grey (2015)
- Fifty Shades Darker (2017)
- Fifty Shades Freed (2018)
- Under the Silver Lake (2018)
- The Sisters Brothers (2018)
- The Kitchen (2019)
- 12 Mighty Orphans (2021)
- Reminiscence (2021)
- Ricky Stanicky (2024)
- Tangled (2028)

Writer

- The Lawnmower Man (1987) (Short film)
- Freddy's Dead: The Final Nightmare (1991)
- In the Mouth of Madness (1994)
- Judge Dredd (1995)

Miscellaneous crew

| Year | Film | Role |
|---|---|---|
| 1989 | A Nightmare on Elm Street 5: The Dream Child | Production executive |
| 2003 | Old School | Production executive |

Thanks

| Year | Film | Role |
|---|---|---|
| 1996 | Bed of Roses | Thanks |
| 1997 | Spawn | Thanks |
| 1997 | Boogie Nights | Special thanks |
| 2008 | Tropic Thunder | The producers wish to thank |
| 2011 | Tower Heist | Special thanks |
| 2018 | The Sisters Brothers | The producers would like to thank |
| 2021 | The Suicide Squad | The filmmakers wish to thank |
| 2021 | Licorice Pizza | Special thanks |
| 2025 | One Battle After Another | Special thanks, credited as Mike De Luca |

=== Television ===
TV specials

- 89th Academy Awards (2017)
- 90th Academy Awards (2018)

Executive producer

| Year | Title | Notes |
|---|---|---|
| 2006 | The Way | Television pilot |
| 2013 | Mob City | |
| 2015 | Childhood's End | |
| 2017 | Embeds | |
| 2018 | Escape at Dannemora | |
| 2020−21 | The Baby-Sitters Club | |
| 2021 | American Rust | |
| 2024 | Shōgun | |

Writer

| Year | Title |
|---|---|
| 1988−89 | Freddy's Nightmares |
| 1991−93 | Dark Justice |
| 1996 | Star Trek: Voyager |

Miscellaneous crew

| Year | Title | Role |
|---|---|---|
| 1988−90 | Freddy's Nightmares | Executive consultant Executive: New Line Cinema |
| 1991 | Dark Justice | Executive story consultant |

As an actor

| Year | Title | Role |
|---|---|---|
| 2006 | The Sopranos | Cop |
