= Fifty Shades Freed =

Erotic romance novel by E.L. James

- Author: E. L. James
- Language: English
- Series: Fifty Shades trilogy
- Genre: Erotic romance
- Published: 17 April 2012 (Vintage Books); 26 April 2012 (UK, Arrow Books)
- Publication place: United Kingdom
- Media type: Print (Hardcover, Paperback)
- Pages: 592
- ISBN: 0345803507
- Preceded by: Fifty Shades Darker
- Followed by: Grey: Fifty Shades of Grey as Told by Christian

Fifty Shades Freed is the third and final installment of the erotic romance Fifty Shades Trilogy by British author E. L. James. After accepting entrepreneur CEO Christian Grey's proposal in Fifty Shades Darker, Anastasia Steele must adjust not only to married life but to her new husband's wealthy lifestyle and controlling nature. The paperback edition was first published in April 2012.

== Plot ==
Anastasia 'Ana' Steele and Christian Grey return to Seattle after a long honeymoon. Christian is upset to find that Ana has kept her maiden name at work. Ana reluctantly starts using the name Grey after realizing how important it is to Christian. As a belated wedding gift, Christian gives Seattle Independent Publishing to Ana, planning to rename it Grey Publishing.

While Christian is on a business trip in New York, Anastasia goes out for a drink with longtime friend Kate Kavanagh, doing so against Christian's wishes. Returning home, she finds that her former boss, Jack Hyde, who was fired for attempting to sexually assault her, has been apprehended by the security staff. Duct tape is found in his pocket and in his van there are tranquilizers and a ransom note—all indications that he intended to kidnap her. Hyde is arrested. Angry with Ana for defying him, Christian cuts short his business trip. At home in Seattle, Christian sulks while Ana sleeps. Eventually, the two argue and Ana berates him for being possessive. She demands more freedom and access to her friends. Christian relents after realizing how much Ana's friends mean to her and that she did the right thing by staying with Kate rather than at home. He later surprises her with a trip to Aspen, with Kate, Elliot, Mia, and Kate's brother, Ethan. While there, Elliot proposes to Kate, who accepts.

Ana's step-father, Ray, is in a medically-induced coma after a car accident. After he awakens a few days later, Ana and Christian arrange to move him to Seattle to recover. It is also Ana's birthday weekend, and Christian surprises her with all her family and friends at a dinner. He gives her a charm bracelet with the charms representing all their "firsts" including an ice cream cone to represent their "vanilla" relationship. Christian also gives her a car. Soon after, Ana learns that she is pregnant. Christian angrily accuses her of getting pregnant on purpose and leaves. He returns the next morning drunk, claiming Ana will choose the baby - whom he believes to be a boy - over him. Ana says it could be a girl, though Christian refuses to accept that due to his sexist nature. Ana becomes furious when she discovers a text message on Christian's phone from his ex-lover Elena Lincoln, the woman who seduced him when he was fifteen and introduced him to the BDSM lifestyle. The message indicates they met for a drink.

The next two mornings, Anastasia and Christian barely speak to each other, though he insists his and Elena's relationship is long-since over. When Christian is away on business for a few days, Ana receives a call from Hyde. He has kidnapped Mia Grey and demands $5 million in two hours. He warns Ana not to tell anyone or he will kill Mia.

Anastasia feigns illness and returns home to escape her bodyguard. She takes a gun and goes to the bank. Before collecting the money, the suspicious bank manager calls Christian, who asks Ana what is going on. He initially believes she is leaving him, but realizes something is amiss. She then approaches a waiting car, shocked that Hyde's accomplice is Elizabeth Morgan, her co-worker. Hyde had instructed Ana to ditch her phone, but she tricks him by hiding her phone in the bag of money and handing over the manager's phone to be discarded instead. With her real phone in the bag, Christian and Taylor, who have already learned of Mia's disappearance and called 911, trace Ana's location. When Ana and Liz arrive at Hyde's location, an angry Hyde hits Ana out of vengeance for losing his job and Ana falls to the ground, hitting her head, causing Elizabeth to worry for Ana's safety. Angry, Elizabeth argues with Hyde. With Ana on the ground, and Hyde distracted by Liz, Ana shoots Hyde in the leg. As she starts to black out she hears Christian calling her name.

Ana wakes three days later in the hospital with Christian at her side. Despite still being anxious about fatherhood, he realizes how important their baby is to her, and they reconcile. Ana returns home the next day. Christian learns from his private investigator, that he and Hyde had the same foster family. Christian tells Ana about how he met and was seduced by Elena. By introducing Christian to the world of BDSM, Elena helped him. If she had not intervened, he would still be plagued with horrible memories of his mother and would never have managed to control his life. He had been recently looking to talk to someone about his problems, and after not being able to contact his psychiatrist, Dr. Flynn, Christian went to Elena's salon. She took him for a drink and to help him relax. Despite having made a pass at him, Elena realized that Christian loved Ana and agreed to leave on good terms. Christian reassures Ana that she did the right thing to call him out for his behavior, as Flynn had been right; he still has a lot of growing up to do.

The next day, a furious Christian discovers that Elena's ex-husband, Eric Lincoln, had bailed Jack from jail out of spite for her affair with Christian. Christian tells Ana that after learning about the affair, Eric severely beat Elena and divorced her. Despite Christian's urging, Elena refused to press charges against Eric out of guilt for the affair. Christian retaliated by buying out Eric Lincoln's logging company to sell it off. Elizabeth also confessed to the police that she was blackmailed by Hyde to be his accomplice.

Seven months later, Ana and Christian have a son named Theodore Raymond Grey, nicknamed Teddy. Two years later, Ana is six months pregnant with their second child, Phoebe. Elliot and Kate have married and have a two-month-old daughter named Ava. After having BDSM sex, Ana and Christian get ready to celebrate Teddy's second birthday with their family and friends.

== Characters ==
- Anastasia "Ana" Rose Grey: Commissioning Editor at SIP (Seattle Independent Publishing) and wife of Christian Grey.
- Christian Grey: Adoptive son of Dr. Grace Trevelyan-Grey and Carrick Grey. 28-year-old CEO of Grey Enterprise Holdings, Inc and Anastasia's husband.
- Jason Taylor: Christian's most trusted bodyguard and head of Christian's security team.
- Luke Sawyer: Bodyguard in charge of Ana's protection.
- Jack Hyde: Ana's former boss and main antagonist.
- Mia Grey: Adoptive daughter of Carrick Grey and Dr. Grace Trevelyan Grey and younger sister of Christian Grey and Elliot Grey.
- Katherine "Kate" Kavanagh: Ana's best friend and Elliot Grey's wife
- Elliot Grey: Elder brother to Christian Grey and Mia Grey and Katherine's husband
- Elena Lincoln: Grace Trevelyan-Grey's former friend and Christian's former dominant. Elena's husband, Eric, found out about her affair with Christian, then severely beat her and divorced her. She refused to press charges against him out of guilt. One of the main antagonists in Fifty Shades Darker
- Dr. Grace Trevelyan-Grey: Christian's adoptive mother.
- Carrick Grey: Christian's adoptive father.
- Ray Steele: Ana's step-father, who adopted Ana and gave her his last name.
- Ethan Kavanagh: Kate Kavanagh's older brother.
- Nishant Mishra: Christian's corporate office's doorman.
- Leila Williams: A former submissive of Christian.
- Elizabeth Morgan: Ana's SIP colleague and accomplice of Jack Hyde.
- Mr. Eric Lincoln: Owner of Lincoln Timbers and Elena's ex-husband.
- Theodore "Teddy" Raymond Grey: Son of Anastasia and Christian Grey.

== Reception ==
Fifty Shades Freed entered The New York Times Best Seller list at number three. In the UK the novel sold over two million copies.

== Film adaptation ==
Sam Taylor-Johnson, the director of the film adaptation of the first installment of the book series, Fifty Shades of Grey, confirmed on 6 February 2015 that both Fifty Shades Freed and the second book in the trilogy, Fifty Shades Darker, would also be adapted for film. In November 2015, Universal Studios announced that both films would be shot back-to-back with principal photography scheduled to commence in early 2016. The film released on 9 February 2018.
