= Fifty Shades Darker =

2012 erotic novel by E. L. James

- 2012 paperback cover
- Author: E. L. James
- Language: English
- Series: Fifty Shades trilogy
- Genre: Erotic romance
- Published: 17 April 2012
- Publisher: Vintage Books
- Publication place: United Kingdom
- Media type: Print (Hardcover, Paperback)
- Pages: 544
- ISBN: 978-0-34580349-8
- Preceded by: Fifty Shades of Grey
- Followed by: Fifty Shades Freed

Fifty Shades Darker is a 2012 erotic romance novel by British author E. L. James. It is the second installment in the Fifty Shades trilogy that traces the deepening relationship between a college graduate, Anastasia Steele, and a young business magnate, Christian Grey. The first and third volumes, Fifty Shades of Grey and Fifty Shades Freed, were published in 2011 and 2012, respectively. The novel is published by Vintage Books and reached No. 1 on the USA Today best seller list.

== Plot ==
Three days after leaving Christian, Anastasia "Ana" Steele begins her job as personal assistant to Jack Hyde, an editor at Seattle Independent Publishing (SIP). He asks Ana out often which, though it makes her uneasy, she writes off. Later, Christian emails her about a gallery exhibit José Rodriguez started in Portland, which she had forgotten. Ana and Christian attend the show together and kiss in an alley. The same night, they have dinner in a restaurant and Christian reveals he wants her any way possible. He wants to resume their relationship, but under Ana's conditions: no rules and no punishments. She agrees.

When attending a masquerade ball at the home of Christian's parents, Ana meets Christian's ex-lover Elena Lincoln, who turns out to own a salon business with Christian. Later, Ana is auctioned off and Christian bids $100,000 for the first dance with her. Ana is disgusted to learn that he continues to be friends with Elena, who seduced him when he was only 15 years old and introduced him to the BDSM lifestyle. Realizing that Christian sees Ana as a girlfriend and not a submissive, Elena becomes antagonistic towards her, trying to sow discord in the budding relationship.

Christian reveals that he bought SIP, but the deal must stay secret for another month. Ana starts feeling Christian is interfering in her career, especially after he freezes the company's accounts, preventing her from going on an overnight business trip to New York with Jack. Christian insists his actions were for her own protection because Jack is a "known philanderer" who has apparently harassed his last five assistants. Jack eventually corners Ana after hours and blackmails her, demanding sexual favors. Ana escapes using her self-defense training from her Dad, and Christian has Jack fired and confiscates his work computer.

Meanwhile, Ana is stalked at work by Leila Williams, one of Christian's former submissives, who turns out to own a gun. Leila's obsession with Christian and Ana began after she left her husband four months before, leading to a mental breakdown. Leila breaks into Ana's apartment and threatens her at gunpoint. Christian defuses the situation by using their dominant/submissive dynamic, leaving Ana worried that he cannot be satisfied with a vanilla relationship. Ana confronts Christian about Leila. Fearing Ana is leaving him again, Christian impulsively puts out his marriage proposal. Ana does not answer, claiming she needs time to consider it.

José, whom Christian still views as a romantic rival, drives to Seattle to visit Ana, which Christian only permits if they both stay at Escala. Ana becomes worried on the night before Christian's 28th birthday when he goes missing flying from Portland to Seattle in his helicopter. He eventually makes it back to Escala safely, explaining that both the helicopter's engines failed; sabotage is suspected. Noticing her own feelings for him, Ana accepts his marriage proposal.

The next day, the Grey family throws Christian a large birthday party. Ana's friend Kate worries after finding an email between Ana and Christian, discussing the BDSM contract. However, Ana assures her that her relationship with Christian is a vanilla one. After the couple announces their engagement, Elena, who still wants Christian, confronts Ana. Accusing Ana of being a gold-digger, Elena claims that a vanilla relationship will never satisfy Christian. Christian interrupts their fight and confronts Elena. He says that while Elena taught him how to take control of his own life, she never once taught him to love like Ana did. Christian's adoptive mother, Grace, overhears the argument and is furious that Elena preyed on her teenage son. After slapping her across the face, Grace rails at Elena for her actions and orders her out of her family's life for good. After Elena leaves, Grace confronts Christian about it. He tells Grace the whole story and decides to end his business relationship with Elena, giving her the salon.

Christian takes Ana to the boathouse, which has been decorated with flowers and soft lights. He proposes properly with a ring and Ana accepts. Outside the Greys' mansion, Jack Hyde secretly watches the party; he is the one who sabotaged Christian's helicopter and has sworn revenge.

== Characters ==
- Anastasia "Ana" Rose Steele: College graduate, PA to Jack Hyde and primary love interest of Christian Grey.
- Christian Grey: 27/28-year-old wealthy entrepreneur and CEO of Grey Enterprises Holdings, Inc.
- Jason Taylor: Christian's bodyguard and the head of Christian's security team.
- Luke Sawyer: Bodyguard in charge of Ana's protection.
- Elena Lincoln: Christian's longtime friend and business partner. She is described as a tall, elegant, sexy, regal platinum blonde and appears to be in her late 30s or early 40s. She is one of the main antagonists aside Jack Hyde.
- Elliot Grey: son of Carrick Grey and Dr. Grace Trevelyan-Grey, and elder brother to Christian Grey and Mia Grey.
- Mia Grey: Adoptive daughter of Carrick Grey and Dr. Grace Trevelyan-Grey and younger sister of Christian Grey and Elliot Grey.
- Katherine "Kate" Kavanagh: Ana's best friend and roommate. In a relationship with Elliot Grey.
- Jack Hyde: Acquisitions Editor at Seattle Independent Publishing (SIP) and Christian Grey's rival. One of the main antagonists aside Elena and becomes the main antagonist in Fifty Shades Freed.
- Leila Williams: A former submissive of Christian and a minor antagonist.
- Ray Steele: Ana's stepfather who had been her father.
- Dr. Grace Trevelyan-Grey: Christian's adoptive mother.
- Carrick Grey: Christian's adoptive father.
- Carla May Wilks: Ana's mother. Married four times.
- Ethan Kavanagh: Kate Kavanagh's older brother and Ana's friend.
- José Rodriguez: Close friend of Ana.
- Elizabeth Morgan: A colleague at SIP.

== Reception ==
The novel reached No. 2 on the USA Today best seller list and is considered by The Guardian to be No. 11 on the Top 100 Bestselling Books of All Time in the United Kingdom.

== Film adaptation ==
In March of 2014, the producer for the eponymous film adaptation of Fifty Shades of Grey, Dana Brunetti, had said there were, as of then, no solid plans to make a sequel. That film was released on 13 February 2015. Before the first film premiered, there was still high anticipation from fans for the sequel to the film. After the first film premiered at a special fan screening in New York City on 6 February 2015, director Sam Taylor-Johnson confirmed two sequels to be succeeded after the first film, with Fifty Shades Darker to be released in 2016. Principal photography commenced in June 2015 in Vancouver, British Columbia, Canada. In April 2015, at the Universal CinemaCon in Las Vegas, Universal announced the release dates of the film along with its sequel. The film was released on 10 February 2017. The first still from the film was released on Friday, 24 April 2015, showing Jamie Dornan as Christian Grey in a black mask looking into a mirror. In April 2015, Universal Pictures chairman Donna Langley told The Hollywood Reporter that the second instalment will be "more of a thriller". In November 2015, Universal Studios announced that both films will be shot back-to-back with principal photography scheduled to commence in early 2016. Filming began in Canada on 9 February 2016 and continued through 12 July 2016. On 28 January 2016, producer Charolette McKinney broke ground on the new project, and it was announced that Kim Basinger would play Elena Lincoln.

== See also ==
- BDSM in culture and media
- Sadism and masochism in fiction
