= Big Eyes: Music from the Original Motion Picture =

Soundtrack album by Danny Elfman and various artists
- Released: December 23, 2014
- Recorded: 2014
- Studios: Abbey Road, London
- Genre: Film soundtrack
- Length: 53:25
- Label: Interscope

Danny Elfman chronology
Mr. Peabody & Sherman (2014)	Big Eyes: Music from the Original Motion Picture (2014)	Fifty Shades of Grey (2015)

Big Eyes: Music from the Original Motion Picture is the soundtrack to the 2014 film Big Eyes. The album featured 14 tracks two original songs written and performed by Lana Del Rey, musical performances from the cast and instrumental pieces from jazz musicians, while the remainder of the album has been accompanied by the original score composed by Danny Elfman. It was distributed by Interscope Records which released the album on December 23, 2014, two days before the film's release.

== Background ==
Burton's frequent collaborator Danny Elfman produced music for Big Eyes. At The Hollywood Reporter roundtable conversation of film composers, Elfman recalled that Burton did not want his score to be grand like that of his previous films, as he did not want to explore the fantasy side through the film; hence, he assembled a smaller orchestra for the film score. At times, Elfman analyzed Burton's state of mind where he felt being pensive as an approval enough.

The film featured two original songs written and performed by Lana Del Rey—the title track and "I Can Fly". Larry Karaszewski, one of the film's writers and producers said that Rey liked the film after watching a preview showcased by Burton, opining that "The whole thing is about a woman who can't find her voice [...] Lana's song expresses what Margaret is feeling so perfectly, it's like a soliloquy of her inner thoughts." Initially the title track was intended to be featured in the closing credits, but as the editing team found two scenes without dialogue and Karaszewski, who thought it to be a "centerpiece number" eventually edited the orchestrated piece from Elfman and placed the song there. The song plays as an instrumental in a sequence where Margaret spots her paintings being sold in a supermarket and then turns into a vocal piece with grand instrument showcasing the character's determination to develop a new style of painting. "I Can Fly" is eventually played in the end credits.

The lyrical video of "Big Eyes" and "I Can Fly" were eventually released on December 2, 2014. Both songs were released in audio formats along with the soundtrack on December 23, 2014 through Interscope Records. The album also featured performances from the cast, as well as instrumental pieces from Miles Davis, Sonny Rollins, Cal Tjader, Red Garland and the Lively Ones, while Elfman's score accompanied the remainder of it.

== Reception ==
A review from Filmtracks.com summarized: "Big Eyes is a decent little score, its suite arrangements on the commercial product recommended for all but Elfman completists." Writing for Knoxville News Sentinel, Chuck Campbell summarised "The classic songs could make great music for a cocktail party, the Del Rey tracks reveal a new side to the provocative performer, and the Elfman material is ambient." Justin Chang of Variety admitted that Elfman's "churning" score propelled the film's tonal shifts between comedy and drama. A. O. Scott of The New York Times described it as "hysterical". Ryan Lattanzio of IndieWire was much critical of Elfman's music, calling it as "one of his laziest ever, and it never, ever stops".

== Track listing ==
Big Eyes: Music from the Original Motion Picture track listing
No.	Title	Performer(s)	Length
1.	"Big Eyes"	Lana Del Rey	4:41
2.	"Bludan"	Cast of Big Eyes	3:15
3.	"Doxy"	Miles Davis & Sonny Rollins	4:55
4.	"Hey Now"	The Red Garland Trio	3:41
5.	"Tropicville"	Cast of Big Eyes	3:10
6.	"Rik-a-Tik"	The Lively Ones	3:02
7.	"A Minor Goof"	Cal Tjader	3:54
8.	"I Can Fly"	Lana Del Rey	5:48
9.	"Opening"	Danny Elfman	3:59
10.	"Who's the Artist?"	Elfman	2:56
11.	"Margaret"	Elfman	3:03
12.	"Walter"	Elfman	4:49
13.	"Victory"	Elfman	4:59
14.	"End Credits"	Elfman	1:12
Total length:			53:25

== Original score ==
The film's original score consisting of 24 tracks was unveiled by The Weinstein Company as a part of their For Your Consideration (FYC) campaign for the 2014–15 film awards season.

Big Eyes (Original Score) track listing
No.	Title	Length
1.	"Opening"	4:01
2.	"Job Opening"	0:43
3.	"Humpty Dumpty"	0:45
4.	"Walter's Confession"	1:15
5.	"Margaret's Apartment"	2:13
6.	"The Brochure"	0:35
7.	"Money"	1:22
8.	"Who's the Artist?"	0:50
9.	"On the Town"	1:05
10.	"Pre-Confession"	0:24
11.	"Almost Caught"	0:31
12.	"Keane Fever"	0:51
13.	"A Moment"	0:29
14.	"DeeAnn's Visit"	1:21
15.	"Revelation"	1:21
16.	"S. Cenic"	2:31
17.	"Jane's Discovery"	1:41
18.	"Going Wrong"	4:50
19.	"The Witness"	0:49
20.	"Margaret Reveals"	1:52
21.	"Off to Court"	0:42
22.	"Walter Testifies"	1:05
23.	"A Challenge"	3:00
24.	"Victory"	2:20
Total length:		36:36

== Accolades ==
Accolades for Big Eyes: Music from the Original Motion Picture
Awards	Date of ceremony	Category	Nominee(s)	Result	Ref.
Critics' Choice Movie Awards	January 15, 2015	Best Song	Lana Del Rey for "Big Eyes"	Nominated	
Golden Globe Awards	January 11, 2015	Best Original Song	Lana Del Rey for "Big Eyes"	Nominated	
Gold Derby Awards	February 19, 2015	Original Song	Lana Del Rey for "Big Eyes"	Nominated	
