= 72nd Golden Globe Awards =

Film award ceremony in 2015

- Official poster
- Date: January 11, 2015
- Site: The Beverly Hilton, Beverly Hills, California, U.S.
- Hosted by: Tina Fey; Amy Poehler

Highlights
- Best Film: Drama: Boyhood
- Best Film: Musical or Comedy: The Grand Budapest Hotel
- Best Drama Series: The Affair
- Best Musical or Comedy Series: Transparent
- Best Miniseries or Television movie: Fargo
- Most awards: Boyhood (3)
- Most nominations: Birdman (7)

Television coverage
- Network: NBC

The 72nd Golden Globe Awards, honoring the best in film and American television of 2014, was broadcast live from the Beverly Hilton Hotel in Beverly Hills, California on January 11, 2015, by NBC. The ceremony was produced by Dick Clark Productions in association with the Hollywood Foreign Press Association. George Clooney was announced as the Cecil B. DeMille Lifetime Achievement Award honoree on September 14, 2014. Tina Fey and Amy Poehler were the co-hosts for the third consecutive time. The nominations were announced on December 11, 2014 by Kate Beckinsale, Peter Krause, Paula Patton and Jeremy Piven. The Affair, Birdman, Boyhood, Fargo, The Theory of Everything, and Transparent were among the films and television shows that received multiple awards.

== Winners and nominees ==
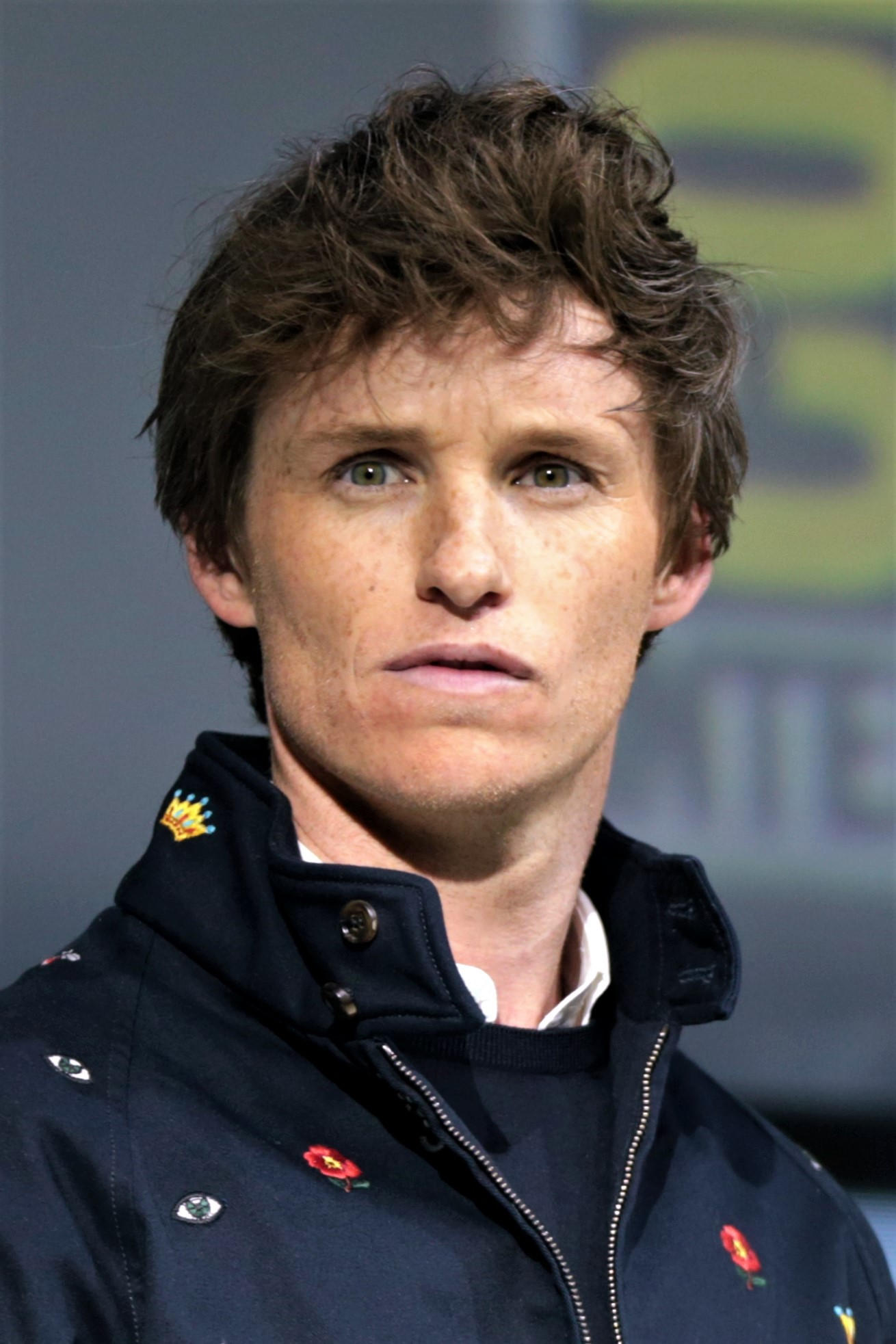
Eddie Redmayne, Best Actor in a Motion Picture – Drama winner

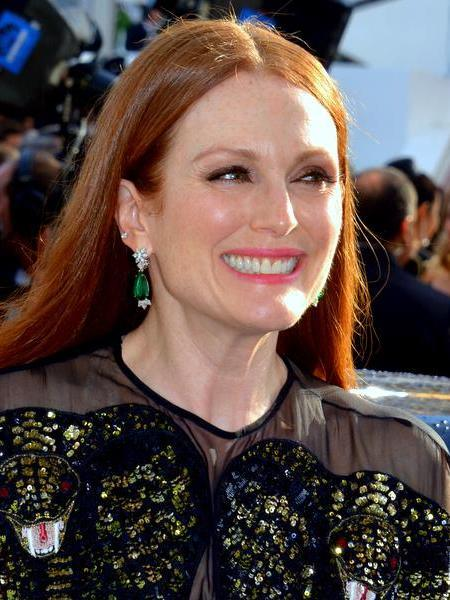
Julianne Moore, Best Actress in a Motion Picture – Drama winner

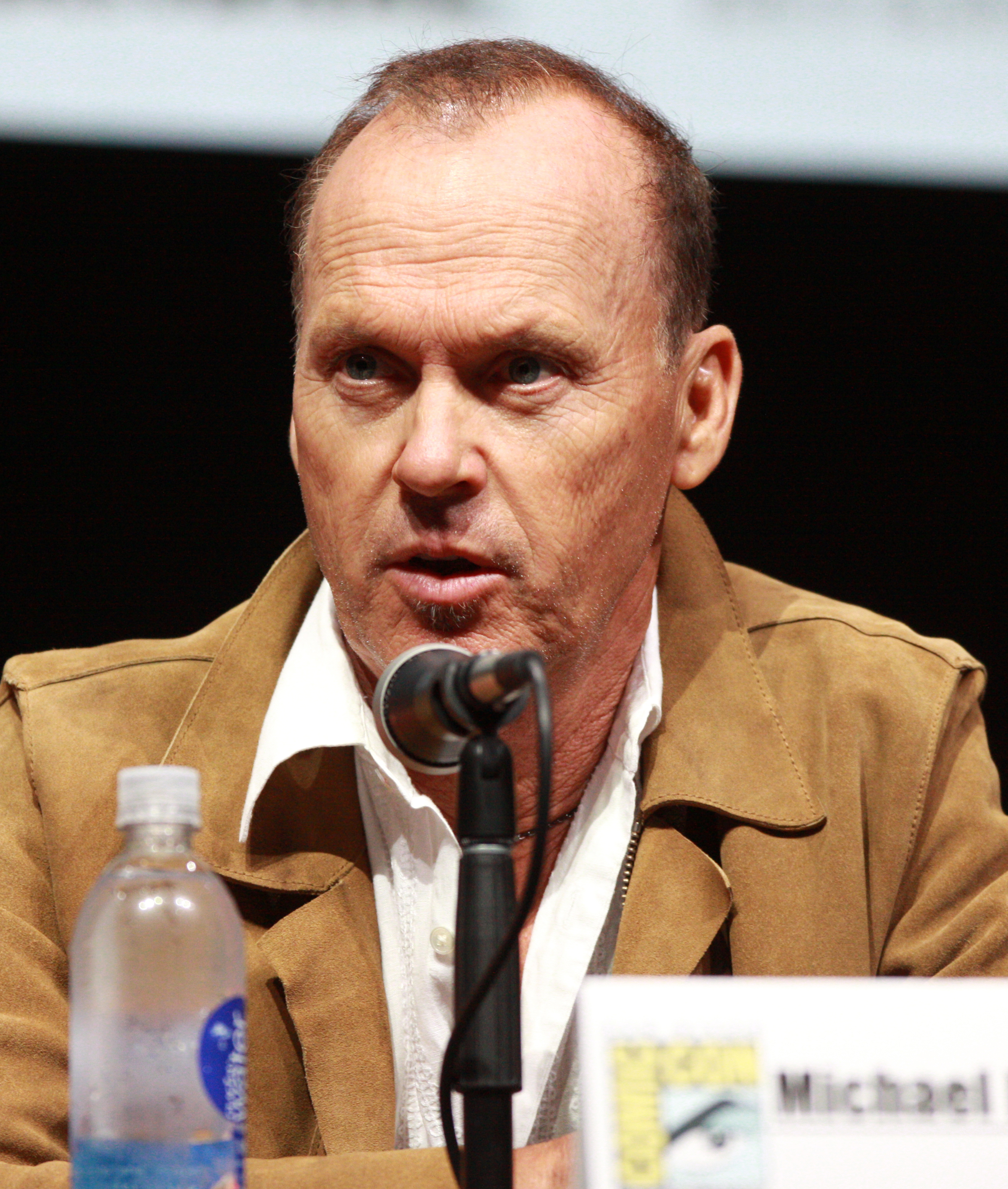
Michael Keaton, Best Actor in a Motion Picture – Musical or Comedy winner

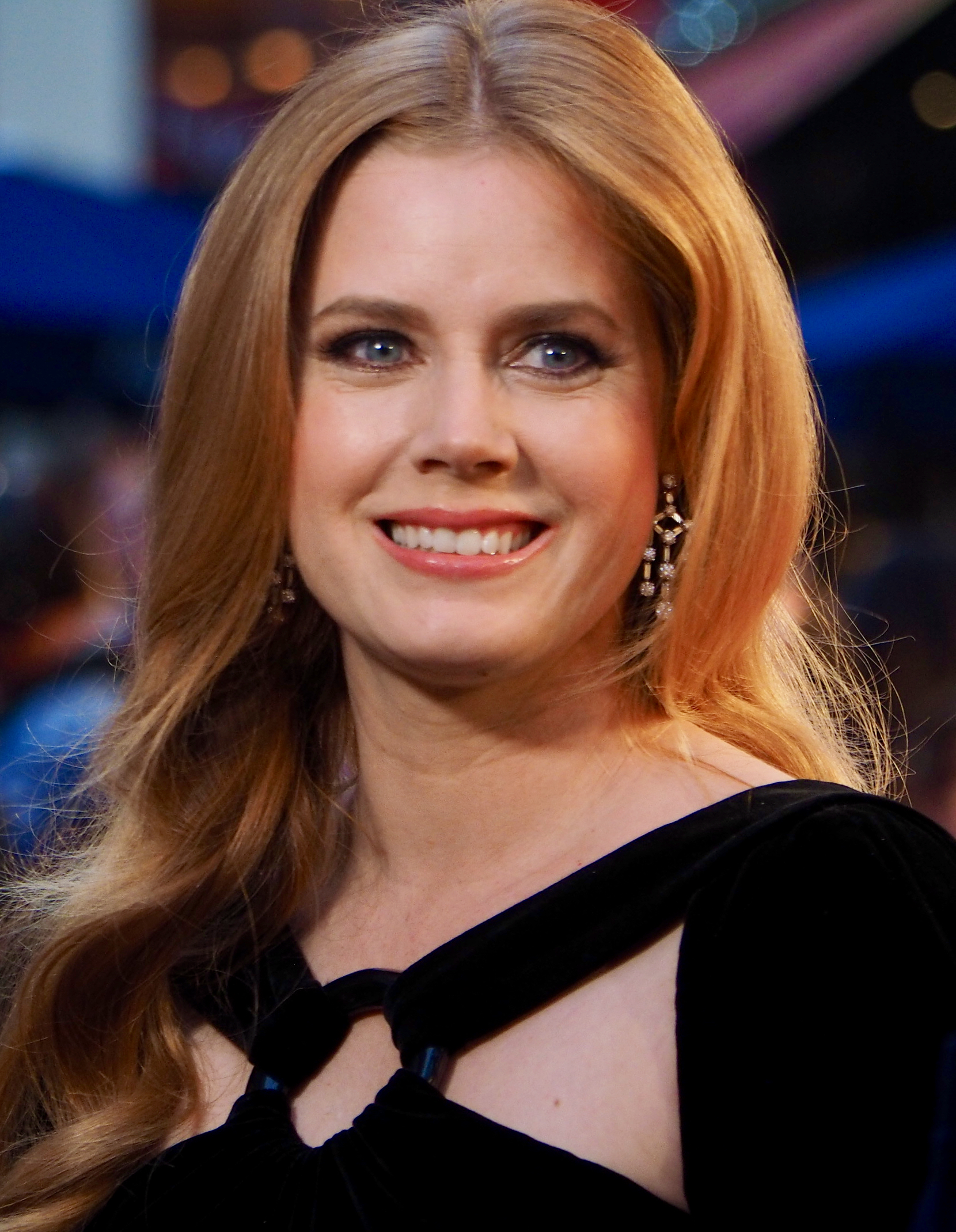
Amy Adams, Best Actress in a Motion Picture – Musical or Comedy winner

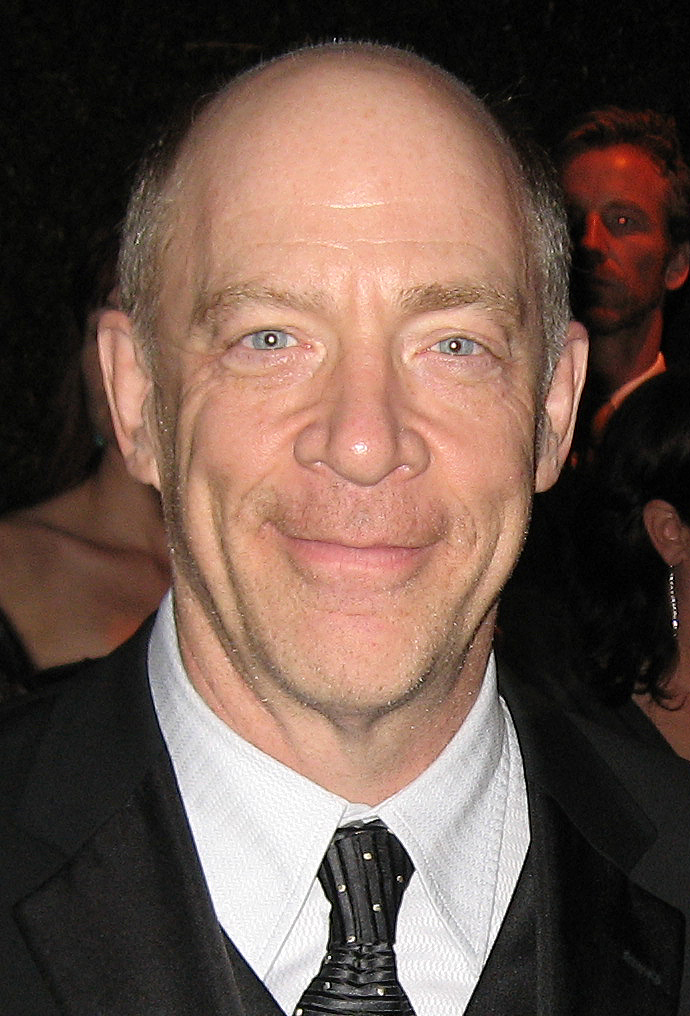
J. K. Simmons, Best Supporting Actor winner

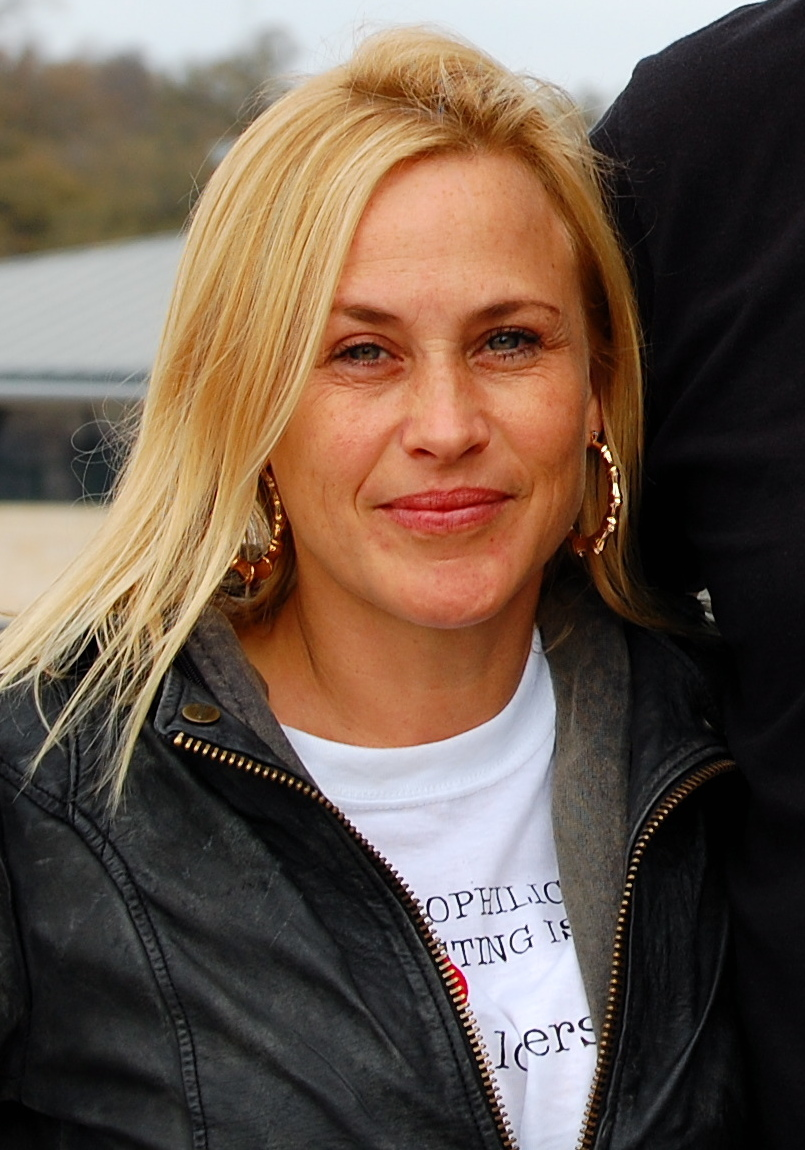
Patricia Arquette, Best Supporting Actress winner

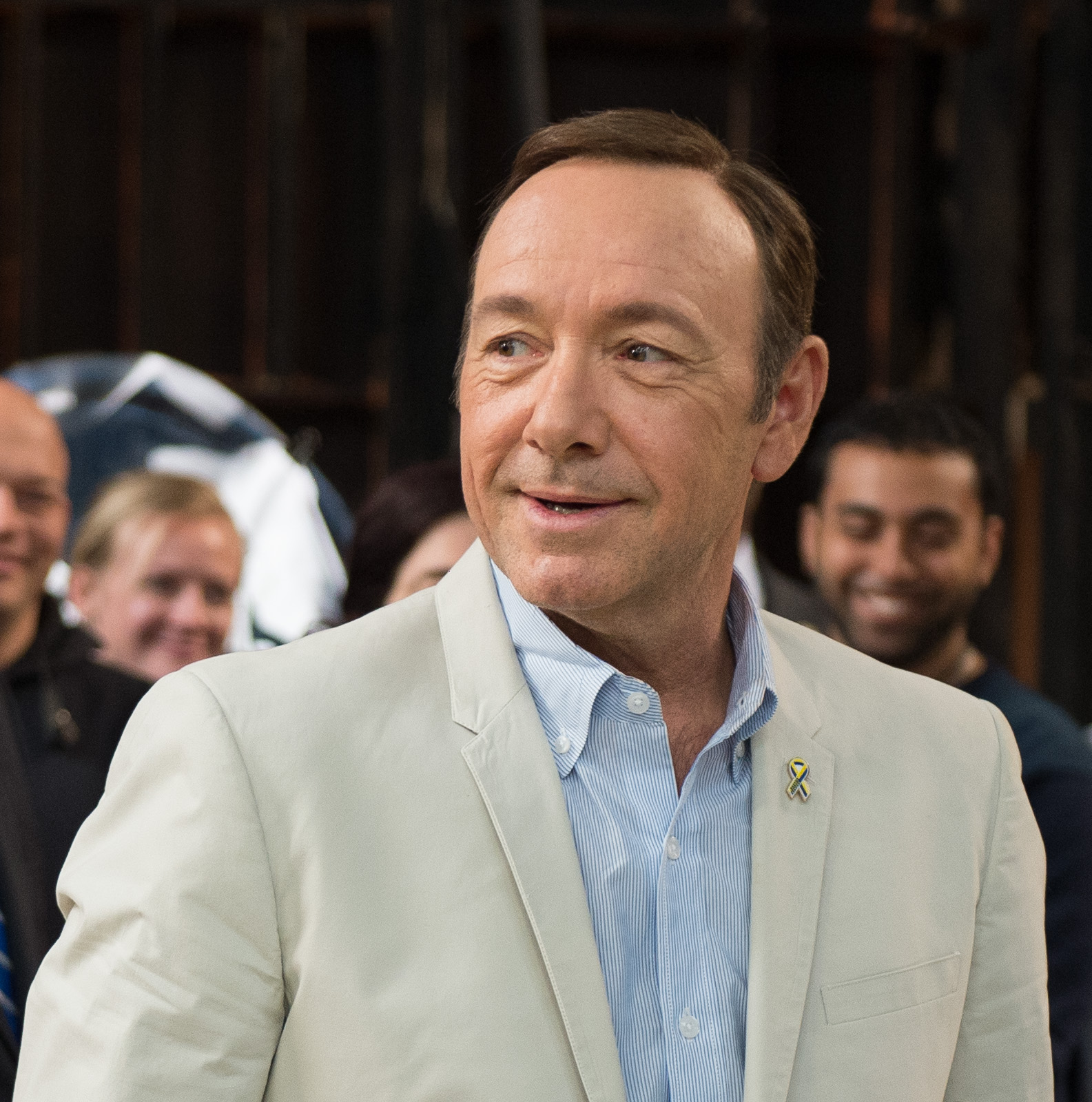
Kevin Spacey, Best Actor in a Television Series – Drama winner

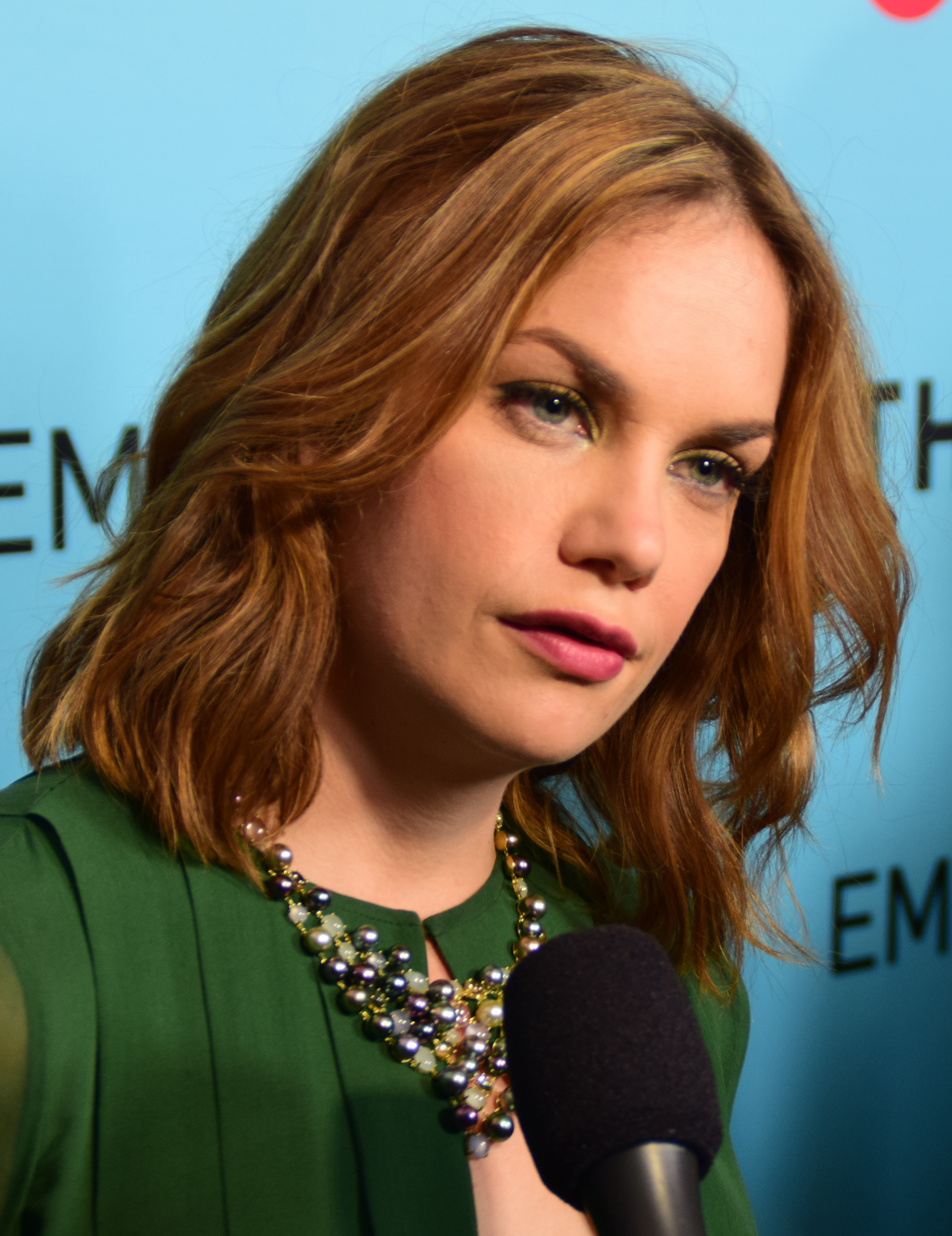
Ruth Wilson, Best Actress in a Television Series – Drama winner

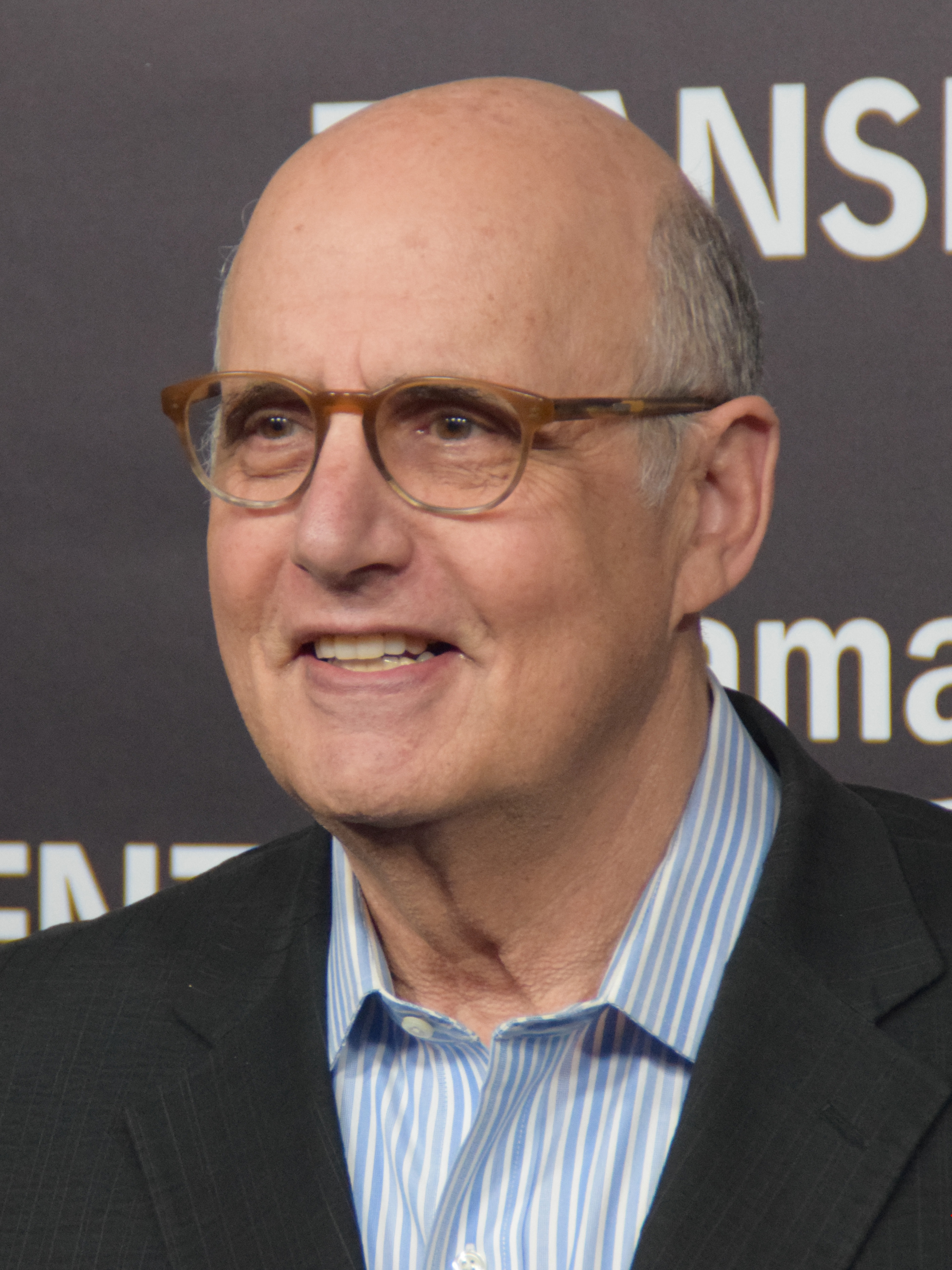
Jeffrey Tambor, Best Actor in a Television Series – Comedy or Musical winner

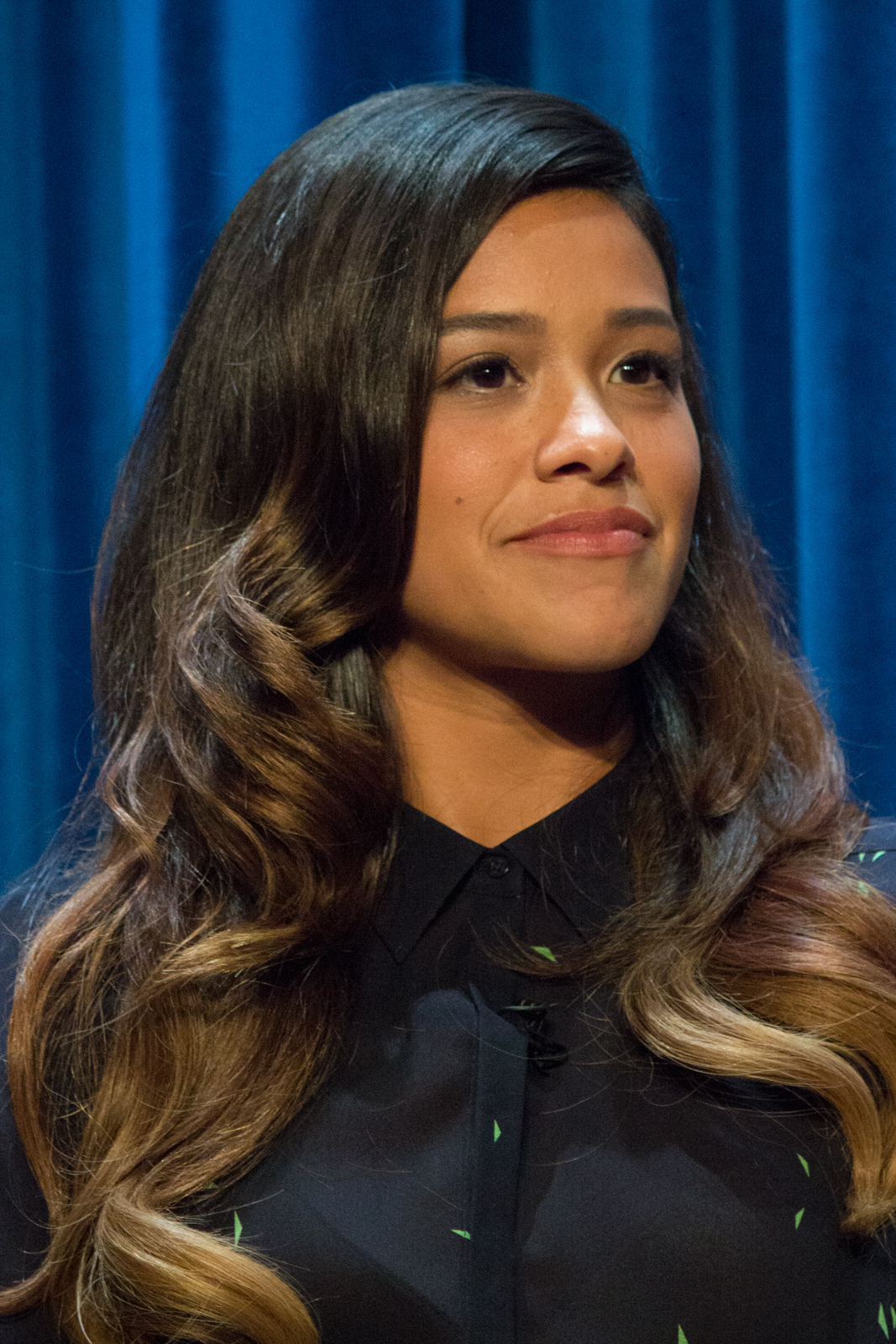
Gina Rodriguez, Best Actress in a Television Series – Comedy or Musical winner

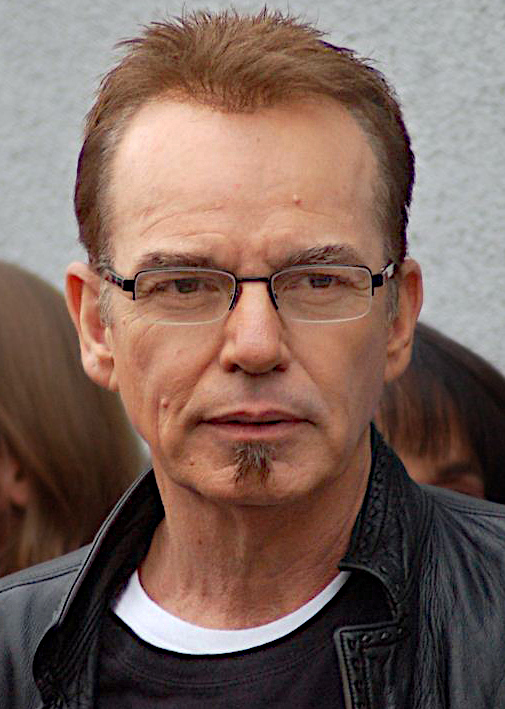
Billy Bob Thornton, Best Actor in a Miniseries or Television Film winner

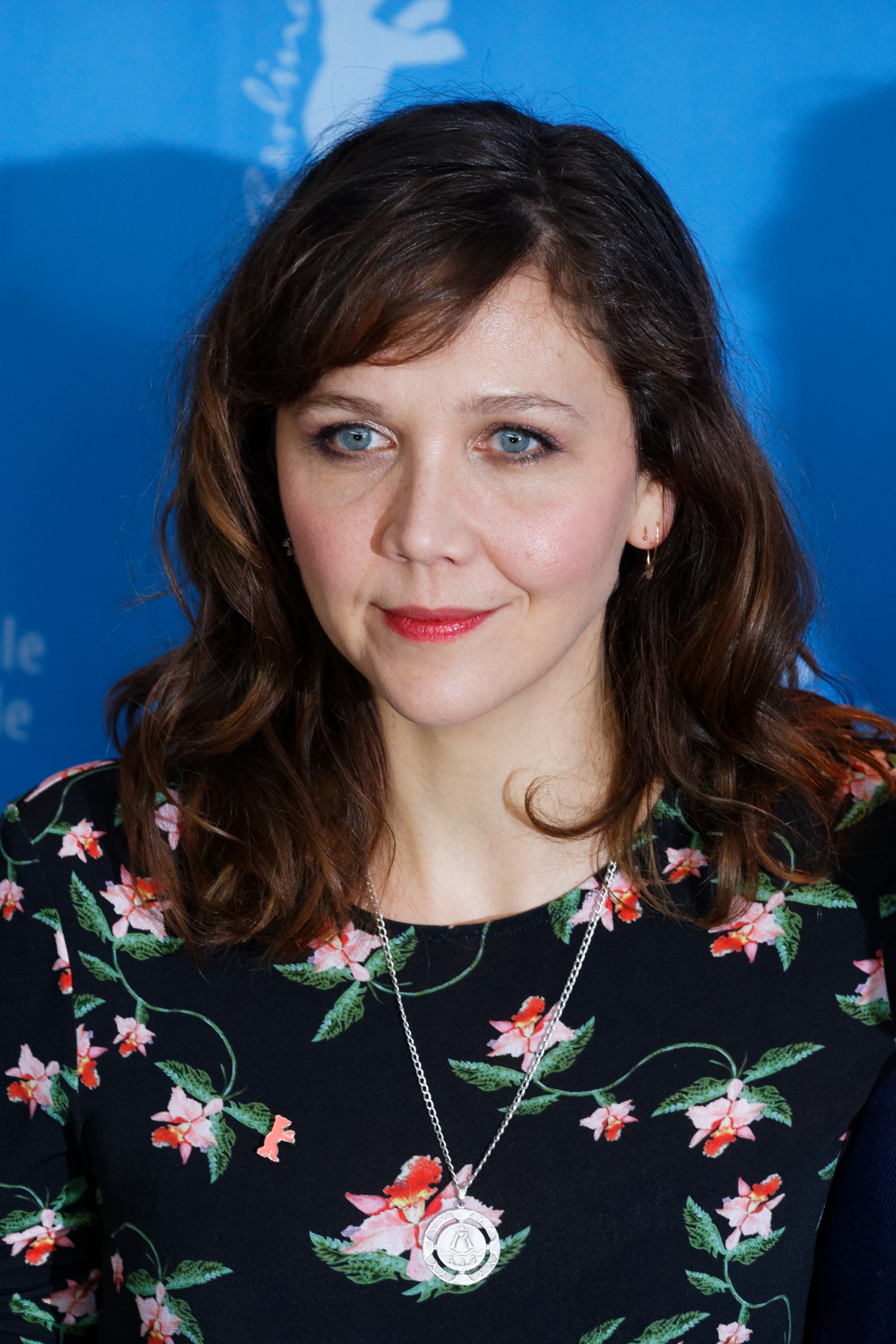
Maggie Gyllenhaal, Best Actress in a Miniseries or Television Film winner

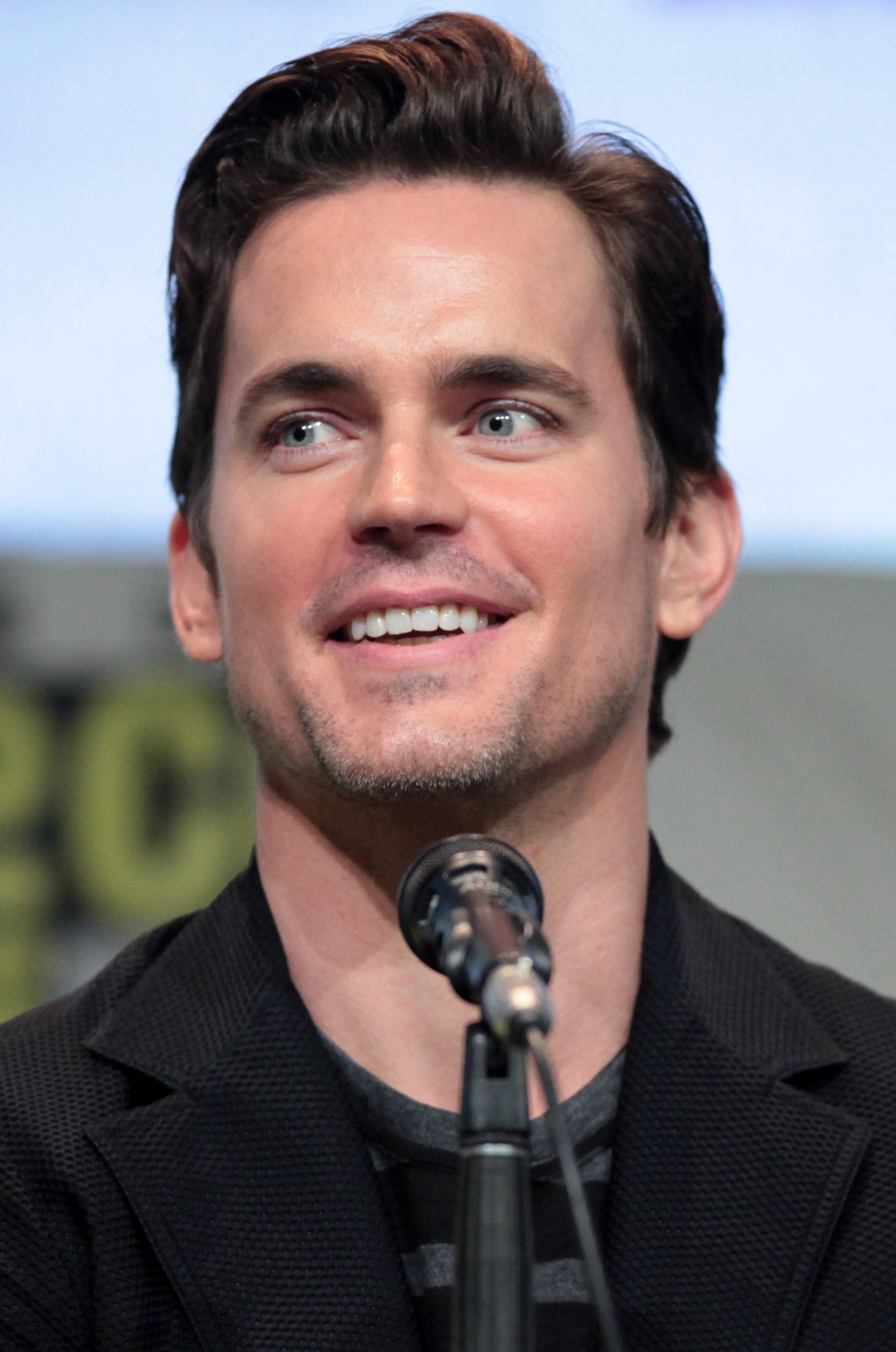
Matt Bomer, Best Supporting Actor in a Series, Miniseries, or Television Film winner

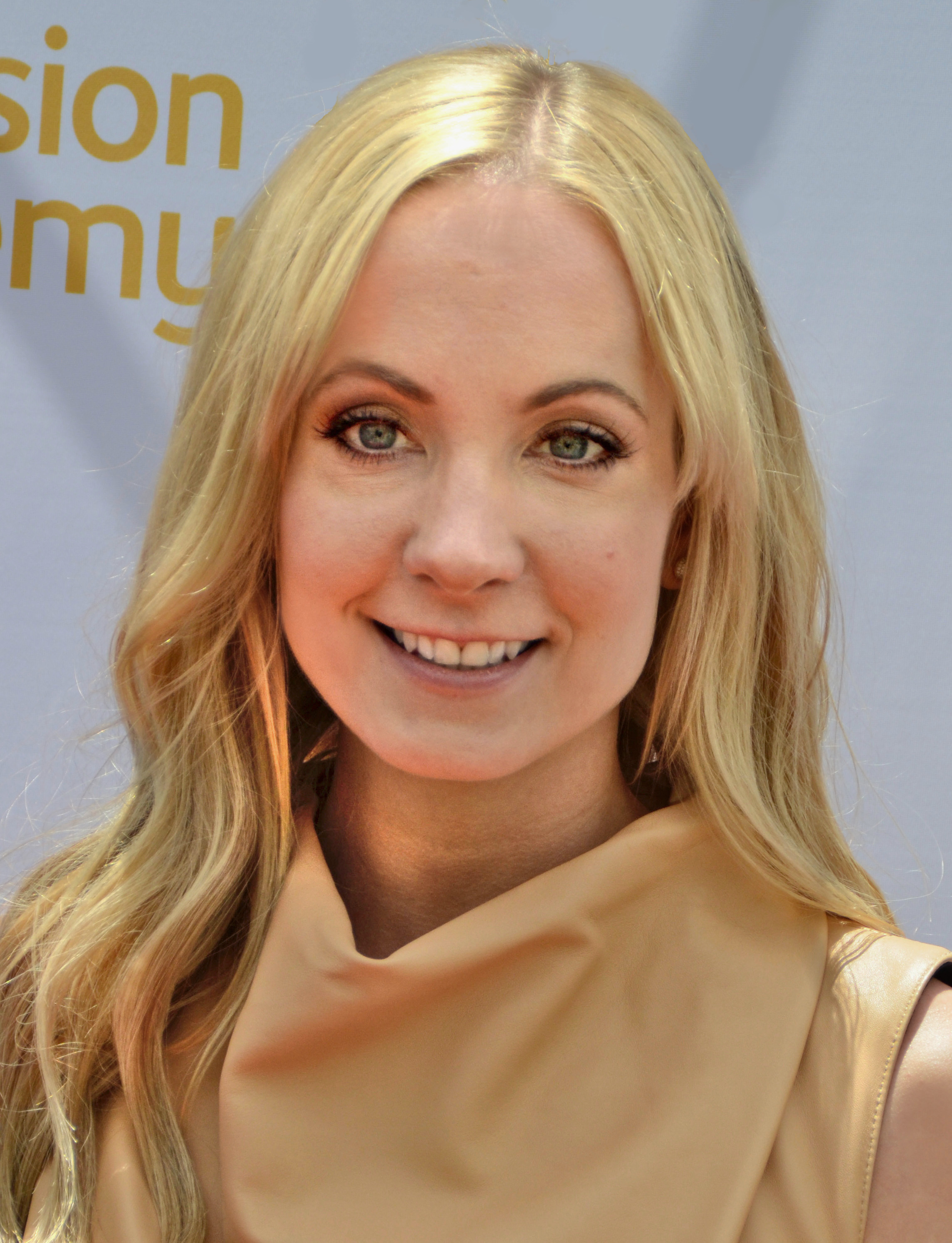
Joanne Froggatt, Best Supporting Actress in a Series, Miniseries, or Television Film winner

These are the nominees for the 72nd Golden Globe Awards. Winners are listed at the top of each list.

=== Film ===
Best Motion Picture
Drama	Musical or Comedy
Boyhood; Foxcatcher; The Imitation Game; Selma; The Theory of Everything	The Grand Budapest Hotel; Birdman; Into the Woods; Pride; St. Vincent
Best Performance in a Motion Picture – Drama
Actor	Actress
Eddie Redmayne – The Theory of Everything as Stephen Hawking; Steve Carell – Foxcatcher as John du Pont; Benedict Cumberbatch – The Imitation Game as Alan Turing; Jake Gyllenhaal – Nightcrawler as Louis "Lou" Bloom; David Oyelowo – Selma as Martin Luther King Jr.	Julianne Moore – Still Alice as Dr. Alice Howland; Jennifer Aniston – Cake as Claire Bennett; Felicity Jones – The Theory of Everything as Jane Hawking; Rosamund Pike – Gone Girl as Amy Elliott-Dunne; Reese Witherspoon – Wild as Cheryl Strayed
Best Performance in a Motion Picture – Musical or Comedy
Actor	Actress
Michael Keaton – Birdman as Riggan Thomson; Ralph Fiennes – The Grand Budapest Hotel as Monsieur Gustave H.; Bill Murray – St. Vincent as Vincent MacKenna; Joaquin Phoenix – Inherent Vice as Larry "Doc" Sportello; Christoph Waltz – Big Eyes as Walter Keane	Amy Adams – Big Eyes as Margaret Keane; Emily Blunt – Into the Woods as The Baker's Wife; Helen Mirren – The Hundred-Foot Journey as Madame Mallory; Julianne Moore – Maps to the Stars as Havana Segrand; Quvenzhané Wallis – Annie as Annie Bennett
Best Supporting Performance in a Motion Picture
Supporting Actor	Supporting Actress
J. K. Simmons – Whiplash as Terence Fletcher; Robert Duvall – The Judge as Judge Joseph Palmer; Ethan Hawke – Boyhood as Mason Evans, Sr.; Edward Norton – Birdman as Mike Shiner; Mark Ruffalo – Foxcatcher as Dave Schultz	Patricia Arquette – Boyhood as Olivia Evans; Jessica Chastain – A Most Violent Year as Anna Morales; Keira Knightley – The Imitation Game as Joan Clarke; Emma Stone – Birdman as Sam Thomson; Meryl Streep – Into the Woods as The Witch
Other
Best Director	Best Screenplay
Richard Linklater – Boyhood; Wes Anderson – The Grand Budapest Hotel; Ava DuVernay – Selma; David Fincher – Gone Girl; Alejandro G. Iñárritu – Birdman	Alejandro G. Iñárritu, Nicolás Giacobone, Alexander Dinelaris Jr., and Armando Bo – Birdman; Wes Anderson – The Grand Budapest Hotel; Gillian Flynn – Gone Girl; Richard Linklater – Boyhood; Graham Moore – The Imitation Game
Best Original Score	Best Original Song
Jóhann Jóhannsson – The Theory of Everything; Alexandre Desplat – The Imitation Game; Trent Reznor and Atticus Ross – Gone Girl; Antonio Sánchez – Birdman; Hans Zimmer – Interstellar	"Glory" (John Legend and Common) – Selma; "Big Eyes" (Lana Del Rey) – Big Eyes; "Mercy Is" (Patti Smith and Lenny Kaye) – Noah; "Opportunity" (Greg Kurstin, Sia Furler, Will Gluck) – Annie; "Yellow Flicker Beat" (Lorde) – The Hunger Games: Mockingjay – Part 1
Best Animated Feature Film	Best Foreign Language Film
How to Train Your Dragon 2; Big Hero 6; The Book of Life; The Boxtrolls; The Lego Movie	Leviathan (Russia); Force Majeure (Sweden); Gett: The Trial of Viviane Amsalem (Israel); Ida (Poland/Denmark); Tangerines (Estonia and Georgia)

=== Films with multiple nominations ===
The following 12 films received multiple nominations:

Nominations	Film
7	Birdman
5	Boyhood
5	The Imitation Game
4	Gone Girl
4	Selma
4	The Grand Budapest Hotel
4	The Theory of Everything
3	Big Eyes
3	Foxcatcher
3	Into the Woods
2	Annie
2	St. Vincent

=== Films with multiple wins ===
The following 3 films received multiple wins:

Wins	Film
3	Boyhood
2	Birdman
2	The Theory of Everything

=== Television ===
Best Series
Drama	Musical or Comedy
The Affair (Showtime); Downton Abbey (PBS); Game of Thrones (HBO); The Good Wife (CBS); House of Cards (Netflix)	Transparent (Amazon Prime Video); Girls (HBO); Jane the Virgin (The CW); Orange Is the New Black (Netflix); Silicon Valley (HBO)
Best Performance in a Television Series – Drama
Actor	Actress
Kevin Spacey – House of Cards (Netflix) as Francis Underwood; Clive Owen – The Knick (Cinemax) as Dr. John "Thack" Thackery; Liev Schreiber – Ray Donovan (Showtime) as Ray Donovan; James Spader – The Blacklist (NBC) as Raymond "Red" Reddington; Dominic West – The Affair (Showtime) as Noah Solloway	Ruth Wilson – The Affair (Showtime) as Alison Lockhart; Claire Danes – Homeland (Showtime) as Carrie Mathison; Viola Davis – How to Get Away with Murder (ABC) as Professor Annalise Keating, J.D.; Julianna Margulies – The Good Wife (CBS) as Alicia Florrick; Robin Wright – House of Cards (Netflix) as Claire Underwood
Best Performance in a Television Series – Musical or Comedy
Actor	Actress
Jeffrey Tambor – Transparent (Prime Video) as Maura Pfefferman; Louis C.K. – Louie (FX) as Louie; Don Cheadle – House of Lies (Showtime) as Marty Kaan; Ricky Gervais – Derek (Netflix) as Derek Noakes; William H. Macy – Shameless (Showtime) as Frank Gallagher	Gina Rodriguez – Jane the Virgin (The CW) as Jane Gloriana Villanueva; Lena Dunham – Girls (HBO) as Hannah Horvath; Edie Falco – Nurse Jackie (Showtime) as Jackie Peyton; Julia Louis-Dreyfus – Veep (HBO) as Vice President Selina Meyer; Taylor Schilling – Orange Is the New Black (Netflix) as Piper Chapman
Best Performance in a Miniseries or Television Film
Actor	Actress
Billy Bob Thornton – Fargo (FX) as Lorne Malvo; Martin Freeman – Fargo (FX) as Lester Nygaard; Woody Harrelson – True Detective (HBO) as Detective Martin Hart; Matthew McConaughey – True Detective (HBO) as Detective Rustin Cohle; Mark Ruffalo – The Normal Heart (HBO) as Ned Weeks	Maggie Gyllenhaal – The Honourable Woman (Sundance TV) as Nessa Stein, Baroness Stein of Tilbury; Jessica Lange – American Horror Story: Freak Show (FX) as Elsa Mars; Frances McDormand – Olive Kitteridge (HBO) as Olive Kitteridge; Frances O'Connor – The Missing (Starz) as Emily Hughes / Walsh; Allison Tolman – Fargo (FX) as Deputy Molly Solverson
Best Supporting Performance in a Series, Miniseries, or Television Film
Supporting Actor	Supporting Actress
Matt Bomer – The Normal Heart (HBO) as Felix Turner; Alan Cumming – The Good Wife (CBS) as Eli Gold; Colin Hanks – Fargo (FX) as Officer Gus Grimly; Bill Murray – Olive Kitteridge (HBO) as Jack Kennison; Jon Voight – Ray Donovan (Showtime) as Mickey Donovan	Joanne Froggatt – Downton Abbey (PBS) as Anna Bates; Uzo Aduba – Orange Is the New Black (Netflix) as Suzanne "Crazy Eyes" Warren; Kathy Bates – American Horror Story: Freak Show (FX) as Ethel Darling; Allison Janney – Mom (CBS) as Bonnie Plunkett; Michelle Monaghan – True Detective (HBO) as Maggie Hart
Best Miniseries or Television Film
Fargo (FX); The Missing (Starz); The Normal Heart (HBO); Olive Kitteridge (HBO); True Detective (HBO)

=== Series with multiple nominations ===
The following 15 series received multiple nominations:

Nominations	Series
5	Fargo
4	True Detective
3	The Affair
3	The Good Wife
3	House of Cards
3	The Normal Heart
3	Olive Kitteridge
3	Orange Is the New Black
2	American Horror Story: Freak Show
2	Downton Abbey
2	Girls
2	Jane the Virgin
2	The Missing
2	Ray Donovan
2	Transparent

=== Series with multiple wins ===
The following 3 series received multiple wins:

Wins	Series
2	The Affair
2	Fargo
2	Transparent

== Presenters ==
The Hollywood Foreign Press Association announced the following presenters:

- Amy Adams with Best Actor in a Motion Picture – Musical or Comedy
- Jennifer Aniston and Benedict Cumberbatch with Best Supporting Actor – Motion Picture
- Kate Beckinsale and Adrien Brody with Best Actress – Miniseries or Television Film
- Jack Black introduced Boyhood
- Don Cheadle and Julianna Margulies with Cecil B. DeMille Award
- Bryan Cranston and Kerry Washington with Best Actress in a Television Series – Comedy or Musical and Best Television Series – Comedy or Musical
- Jamie Dornan and Dakota Johnson with Best Supporting Actress – Series, Miniseries or Television Film
- Robert Downey Jr. with Best Motion Picture – Musical or Comedy
- David Duchovny and Katherine Heigl with Best Actor in a Television Series – Drama
- Anna Faris and Chris Pratt with Best Actress in a Television Series – Drama
- Colin Farrell and Lupita Nyong'o with Best Foreign Language Film
- Colin Firth introduced The Imitation Game
- Jane Fonda and Lily Tomlin with Best Actor in a Television Series – Comedy or Musical
- Harrison Ford with Best Director – Motion Picture
- Ricky Gervais with Best Actress in a Motion Picture – Musical or Comedy
- Bill Hader and Kristen Wiig with Best Screenplay
- Kevin Hart and Salma Hayek with intro of Miss Golden Globe and Best Animated Feature Film
- Katie Holmes and Seth Meyers with Best Supporting Actor – Series, Miniseries or Television Film
- Kate Hudson introduced Into the Woods
- Jared Leto with Best Supporting Actress – Motion Picture
- Adam Levine and Paul Rudd with Best Television Series – Drama
- Jennifer Lopez and Jeremy Renner with Best Miniseries or Television Film and Best Actor – Miniseries or Television Film
- Melissa McCarthy introduced St. Vincent
- Matthew McConaughey with Best Actress in a Motion Picture – Drama
- Sienna Miller and Vince Vaughn with Best Original Score
- Clive Owen introduced The Theory of Everything
- Gwyneth Paltrow with Best Actor in a Motion Picture – Drama
- Prince with Best Original Song
- Meryl Streep with Best Motion Picture – Drama
- Channing Tatum introduced Foxcatcher
- Naomi Watts introduced Birdman
- Owen Wilson introduced The Grand Budapest Hotel
- Oprah Winfrey introduced Selma
- Catherine Zeta-Jones introduced Pride

== Reception ==
The show received mixed to positive reviews, with critics praising hosts Tina Fey and Amy Poehler's jokes as well as the multitude of political commentary in speeches. However, the ceremony's lack of energy and adherence to routine faced negative criticism. Sean O'Neal of The A.V. Club lamented Fey and Poehler's previous announcement that this would be their final year hosting—"Hosts Tina Fey and Amy Poehler reminded everyone why they will be sorely missed next year"—which presenter Meryl Streep echoed as she introduced the "Best Motion Picture—Drama" category. Jethro Nededog of The Wrap was among many reviewers to praise Fey and Poehler, though he wished they had appeared more often throughout the ceremony, claiming, "the fun was front-loaded".

Comedian Margaret Cho appeared at several instances as a disapproving North Korean film critic, parodying North Korea's reaction and condemnation of the film The Interview two months earlier. Cho had previously played Kim Jong-Il and Kim Jong-Un on Fey's comedy series 30 Rock, the latter role garnering Cho a Primetime Emmy Award nomination for Outstanding Guest Actress in a Comedy Series. Some reviewers enjoyed the recurring gag and Cho's skewering of Best Television Series – Musical or Comedy nominee Orange Is the New Black's placement in the "Comedy" category. Others found Cho's appearances "interminable".

Of note during the ceremony were overt references to oppressed populations and current political events in several victors' speeches. Best Supporting Actress – Series, Miniseries or Television Film winner Joanne Froggatt, referencing her Downton Abbey character Anna Bates's experience with sexual assault, addressed real-world survivors of sexual abuse and rape. Best Actor – Television Series Musical or Comedy winner Jeffrey Tambor thanked the transgender community and Transparent creator Joey Soloway dedicated their award to recent trans suicide victim Leelah Alcorn. Best Original Song winner Common alluded to the Ferguson, Missouri police's shooting of Michael Brown as well as to the 2014 NYPD officer killings by armed civilians. Best Actress – Television Series Musical or Comedy winner Gina Rodriguez mentioned her programs's relevance to Latino viewers, and Best Supporting Actor – Series, Miniseries or Television Film winner Matt Bomer expressed solidarity and remorse for the LGBT victims of the AIDS crisis.

=== Ratings ===
The ceremony averaged a Nielsen 12.6 rating/19 share and was watched by 19.3 million viewers. This rating was an eight percent decline from the previous ceremony's viewership of 20.9 million, the highest in a decade.
