= Big Eyes (song) =

2014 title track by Lana Del Rey

Song by Lana Del Rey

from the album Big Eyes: Music from the Original Motion Picture
- Released: December 23, 2014
- Length: 4:41
- Label: Interscope
- Songwriters: Lana Del Rey; Dan Heath
- Producer: Dan Heath

Audio
- "Big Eyes" on YouTube

"Big Eyes" is a song by American singer and songwriter Lana Del Rey. It was written by Del Rey and producer Dan Heath and served as the title track to Tim Burton's film Big Eyes. It was officially released on December 23, 2014 via digital download by Interscope Records as part of the movie's soundtrack album. The song's lyrics make reference to the lead character's emotions as she discovers her paintings being sold in a supermarket in the middle of the film.

The song was nominated for Best Original Song at the 72nd Golden Globe Awards. On December 13, the song was shortlisted as one of 79 potential nominees for the Academy Awards for Best Original Song, but failed to earn a nomination.

== Background and composition ==
Del Rey wrote and performed two songs for Big Eyes. The title track is heard during the film, while "I Can Fly" plays over the end credits. According to Larry Karaszewski, one of the film's producers, "Tim showed her the film and she fell in love with it. Women in particular seem to get the movie, and Lana really got the movie. The whole thing is about a woman who can't find her voice. Lana's song expresses what Margaret is feeling so perfectly, it's like a soliloquy of her inner thoughts."

Consequence of Sound said both "Big Eyes" and "I Can Fly" "begin life as minimalist piano ballads before exploding into lush orchestral overtures, with Del Rey’s achy croon providing layer upon layer of heartache and melancholy."

== Promotion ==
A teaser lyric video for "Big Eyes" featuring Amy Adams, who stars in the film, was released on December 1, 2014. The official audio was uploaded on Del Rey's Vevo account on December 19, 2014, reaching over 14.5 million views as of December 4, 2020.

The Weinstein Company, the film studio behind Big Eyes, decided to submit the song to the Academy Award for Best Original Song.

== Reception ==
Billboard's Chris Payne wrote that Del Rey's "vocal theatrics and some harrowingly haunting string-laden production draw us in". Esther Zuckerman of Entertainment Weekly said the title track "delivers on its Del Rey-ian promise with a dramatic, retro flair".

=== Accolades ===
"Big Eyes" was shortlisted for the Academy Award for Best Original Song on December 13, 2014, with final nominees announced on January 15, 2015, failing to earn a nomination. On December 11, 2014, the song was nominated for Best Original Song at the 72nd Golden Globe Awards. On December 15, 2014, it received a nomination for Best Song at the 20th Critics' Choice Awards, which took place on January 15, 2015.

Awards
Year	Award	Category	Result
2015	87th Academy Awards	Best Original Song	Shortlisted
2015	72nd Golden Globe Awards	Best Original Song	Nominated
2015	20th Critics' Choice Awards	Best Song	Nominated
