= Screwed (2000 film) =

2000 film by Scott Alexander and Larry Karaszewski

- Theatrical release poster
- Directed by: Scott Alexander Larry Karaszewski
- Written by: Scott Alexander; Larry Karaszewski
- Produced by: Robert Simonds
- Starring: Norm Macdonald; Dave Chappelle; Elaine Stritch; Daniel Benzali; Sarah Silverman; Sherman Hemsley; Danny DeVito
- Cinematography: Robert Brinkmann
- Edited by: Michael Jablow
- Music by: Michel Colombier
- Production company: Brillstein-Grey Entertainment
- Distributed by: Universal Pictures
- Release date: May 12, 2000
- Running time: 81 minutes
- Country: United States
- Language: English
- Budget: $10 million
- Box office: $7 million

Screwed is a 2000 American dark comedy film written and directed by Scott Alexander and Larry Karaszewski, in their feature directorial debuts. It stars Norm Macdonald, Dave Chappelle, Elaine Stritch, Daniel Benzali, Sarah Silverman, Sherman Hemsley, and Danny DeVito. The film was released by Universal Pictures and received generally negative reviews.

== Plot ==
Willard is an overworked, underpaid chauffeur who works for a mean-spirited pie heiress named Mrs. Crock, just as his father did before him. All Willard wants for Christmas is a new uniform, as the one he currently wears is the one his father was buried in, but Crock gives him a cheap pair of cuff links and a pie instead, while lavishing expensive gifts on her business partner Chip Oswald and her prized dog Muffin. Finally fed up with being mistreated, Willard and his best friend, local chicken restaurant owner Rusty, concoct a scheme to kidnap the dog and hold it for a $1,000,000 ransom. Muffin attacks him, leaving a great deal of destruction and Willard's blood at the scene, and the plan fails when the dog later escapes.

However, Crock and the Pittsburgh police misinterpret the hastily scrawled ransom note and believe that Willard himself has been kidnapped. Crock refuses to pay up initially until met with public protests led by Willard's on-again off-again girlfriend Hillary. Willard and Rusty come up with a new scheme, in which Willard films a fake ransom video and releases it to the media, putting pressure on Crock to come up with the money to preserve her public image as a kindly old grandmother. The plan calls for Willard to mug his boss as she goes to drop off the ransom money, and to have a dead body left behind dressed as Willard to throw off the police. They enlist the services of a creepy morgue employee named Grover Cleaver to find an appropriate corpse and schedule a meeting at night in the park.

This plan also goes wrong, however, when Willard succeeds in getting the money, only to lose it to two small children who attack him with a taser and a shiv and steal the suitcase. Willard is found by the police and sent to a hospital, as the children have soundly brutalized him. The police then find the dead body that was supposed to take the place of Willard as he made his getaway, and Willard claims that it was his captor. The police are suspicious, as Grover used the body of an old homeless dwarf, but Willard claims he was "more ferocious when he was alive." Willard dejectedly returns to work for Mrs. Crock (who claims that he now owes her the ransom as well) until the mother of one of his attackers shows up and returns the briefcase. Overjoyed, Willard and Rusty plan to go on a long vacation only to find that the briefcase was filled with newspaper and cabbage.

After interrogating Willard and Rusty (during which Rusty reveals his habit of striking people with desk lamps when nervous), the police go after Grover, who goes on a rampage, kidnapping Mrs. Crock while waiting for the share of money Willard promised him. Willard goes to Grover and confronts his employer, finding out that the money was actually in the briefcase but was stolen by Chip Oswald, who planned to double-cross them all and make off with his boyfriend. He also discovers, to everyone's disgust, that his father was also Mrs. Crock's lover as well as manservant. After the police converge on Grover's place, Crock convinces them that the trio are actually her rescuers.

In the end, Willard leads the police to Chip's house, where the ransom money is discovered. When Chip pulls a gun, Rusty panics and knocks him unconscious by hitting him in the head with a lava lamp. Mrs. Crock expresses her gratitude by paying for Willard to attend college at the University of Southern California and buying him a new Armani suit, and paying for Rusty to open a new Chicken Hole on the beach. Willard finally reconciles with Hillary, while Crock ends up in a romantic relationship with Grover.

== Cast ==
- Norm Macdonald as Willard Fillmore
- Dave Chappelle as Rusty P. Hayes
- Danny DeVito as Grover Cleaver
- Elaine Stritch as Virginia Crock
- Daniel Benzali as Detective Tom Dewey
- Sarah Silverman as Hillary
- Sherman Hemsley as Chip Oswald
- Malcolm Stewart as Roger
- Lochlyn Munro as Officer Richardsen

== Reception ==
On Rotten Tomatoes, Screwed holds a score of 10% with an average rating of 3.5/10, sampled from 30 reviews. The consensus reads: "Despite having real comics in the cast, this tedious and painfully unfunny movie desperately needs a screenplay." Metacritic gives the film a score of 7 out of 100 based on 13 reviews, indicating "overwhelming dislike".

During Norm Macdonald's final special, Nothing Special, released on Netflix in May 2022, Chappelle revealed that he "did everything he could" to back out of the movie, as it followed the death of his father, which left him "inconsolable." Chappelle said that Macdonald was the only person who could make him laugh at the time, and cites him as "one of the funniest and most important people" with whom he ever worked.

The base plot of Screwed was adapted into the 2009 Bollywood film De Dana Dan.
