= Mr. Peabody & Sherman (soundtrack) =

2014 soundtrack album

Mr. Peabody & Sherman: Music from the Motion Picture

Film score by Danny Elfman
- Released: March 3, 2014
- Recorded: 2012–2014
- Genre: Film score
- Length: 50:10
- Label: Relativity Music Group

Danny Elfman chronology
American Hustle (2013)	Mr. Peabody & Sherman (2014)	Big Eyes (2014)

Mr. Peabody & Sherman: Music from the Motion Picture is the score album composed by Danny Elfman for the 2014 film of the same name. The soundtrack was released by Relativity Music Group on March 3, 2014. Peter Andre wrote and performed for the film a song titled "Kid", which is played during the British version of the end credits, instead of Grizfolk's "Way Back When". But unlike the latter, the former was not included in the soundtrack.

== Development ==
The original score is composed by Danny Elfman in his first collaboration with Rob Minkoff, and also his first DreamWorks Animation project. Elfman had contacted with DreamWorks for several of the company's projects, before signing for Mr. Peabody & Sherman. Minkoff called it as one of his "most interesting collaborations" and wanted to work with him for a long time, due to his signature of work, adding "I didn't want his score for this film to be like those that's he's done with Tim Burton cause this film is different in tone and style. And he seemed to embrace it very well."

Originally, Alan Silvestri, who had collaborated with Minkoff on Stuart Little (1999) and its sequel Stuart Little 2 (2002), was going to compose the score, but dropped out of it and instead went on to score another DreamWorks Animation film, The Croods (2013). While scoring for the film, Elfman had opined "There's a quirky sub-theme that's not the theme of the movie that happens a few times. It certainly happens at the beginning when you meet [Mr. Peabody], and at the end, where I was able to enjoy tapping right back to my original roots. That's what Rob [Minkoff] and I talked about and was fun to do." In addition to Elfman's score, the film also features two original songs. Peter Andre, who wrote and performed the original song "Kid", told in an interview "When I found out that it was about a father and son relationship, I couldn't help comparing it to the one I have with Junior so I jumped at the chance." It was played in the end credits, instead of "Way Back When" by Grizfolk, when the film was set to release in United States. However, Andre's song "Kid" was not featured in the soundtrack, while "Way Back When" was featured. Along with the original songs, John Lennon's "Beautiful Boy (Darling Boy)" was also featured in the film as well as the album.

== Track listing ==
All music is composed by Danny Elfman, except as noted.

No.	Title	Length
1.	"Mr. Peabody's Prologue"	3:19
2.	"Reign of Terror!"	2:48
3.	"The Drop Off"	1:14
4.	"The Dog Whistle"	0:48
5.	"The Cherry Tree"	0:59
6.	"A Deep Regard"	0:52
7.	"Beautiful Boy (Darling Boy)" (John Lennon)	3:51
8.	"Dinner Party"	0:30
9.	"The Petersons / The Wabac Machine"	3:08
10.	"Mariachi Madness" (Jimena Contreras)	2:10
11.	"Off to Egypt"	2:07
12.	"The Wedding Exodus"	1:05
13.	"Hammer-Time"	0:57
14.	"The Flying Machine"	4:42
15.	"Trojan Horse"	3:25
16.	"War / Disaster"	3:32
17.	"History Mash-Up"	4:33
18.	"I'm a Dog Too"	3:41
19.	"Fixing the Rip"	2:13
20.	"Back to School"	1:16
21.	"Aquarela do Brasil (Coda)"	1:03
22.	"The Amazing Mr. Peabody"	0:34
23.	"Way Back When" (Grizfolk)	2:47
Total length:		50:10

== Reception ==
James Christopher Monger of AllMusic wrote "Quirky and melodious, Elfman delivers with his signature blend of warmth and whimsy." Chris Coplan of Consequence Of Sound wrote "Elfman is skilled at capturing a film's mood through music, here finding a balance between family-friendly playfulness and the source material's kookier roots. Across a myriad of sounds, from classical to samba to Egyptian folk, Elfman's compositions are both sweepingly grand and utterly comical, the perfect accompaniment for the tale of a time-hopping dog and his beloved best friend."

Filmtracks.com wrote "Elfman lays waste to several influences that are intentionally impressed upon the score, including outward classical and anthemtic references. There are also subtle allusions to possible temp track placements, especially in the adherence to styles better attributed to both Powell and Silvestri. But, on the whole, this score is absolutely saturated with Elfman's trademark mainstream musical mannerisms. The bouncing sequences of upbeat melody feature, for instance, the composer's expected bass string plucked rhythms and slightly jazzy saxophone or brass themes on top. The orchestra is well utilized in the soundscape, Elfman applying a wealth of impressive compositional techniques, especially with the woodwinds, that keeps the work technically superior."

Matt Zoller Seitz of RogerEbert.com called it as "sprightly-bombastic score". Guy Lodge of Variety wrote "Danny Elfman's score, like much else here, is zippy in the moment but not especially distinctive." York Vision-writer Morenike Adebayo called it as "glorious soundtrack". Reading Eagle wrote "Danny Elfman crafts a score that's sprightly and sentimental".

== Chart performance ==
Chart (2014)	Peak position
UK Soundtrack Albums (OCC)	32
US Soundtrack Albums (Billboard)	8

== Personnel ==
Credits adapted from CD liner notes.

- Music composer and producer – Danny Elfman

Orchestra

- Orchestration – Dave Slonaker, Edgardo Simone, Edward Trybek, John Ashton Thomas, Peter Bateman, Steve Bartek, Timothy Rodier
- Supervising orchestrator – Steve Bartek
- Orchestra leader – Thomas Bowes
- Conductor – Rick Wentworth
- Contractor – Isobel Griffiths, Jo Changer
- Copyist – Mark Graham, Ron Vermillion, David Hage
- Pro-tools operator – Adam Olmsted
- Technical engineer – Greg Maloney

Choir

- Choir – Metro Voices
- Choirmaster – Jenny O'Grady

Management

- Music business affairs – Kevin Breen
- Music clearances (Relativity Media Group) – Christine Bergren, Julie Butchko
- Executive in charge of music (DreamWorks Animation) – Sunny Park
- Executive in charge of soundtracks (Relativity Media Group) – Jason Markey
- Soundtrack executive producer – Bob Bowen, Jason Markey, Ryan Kavanaugh
- Studio manager – Mike Rizzuto, Alison Burton, Simon Knee
- Coordinator (Relativity Media Group) – Ian Broucek
- Studio assistance – Laurence Anslow
- Packaging and design – Jordan Butcher

Technical

- Programming – Peter Bateman
- Arrangements – Chris Bacon, John Ashton Thomas, Paul Mounsey, Peter Bateman
- Recording – Peter Cobbin, Chris Barrett, Noah Snyder
- Editing – Shie Rozow, Denise Okimoto, Bill Abbott
- Mastering – Stephen Marsh
- Mixing – Dennis Sands, Greg Hayes
- Music supervision – Charlene Ann Huang, Marc Mann
- Music co-ordinator – Melisa McGregor
- Music production assistant – Matt Campbell
- Music consultant – Chris Douridas
- Musical assistance – Melissa Karaban, Jared Forman, Steve Bauman
