= Fifty Shades of Grey (score) =

Fifty Shades Of Grey (Original Motion Picture Score)

Film score by Danny Elfman
- Released: February 17, 2015
- Studios: Sony Scoring Stage, Sony Pictures Studios, Culver City; Studio Della Morte, Los Angeles; Paramount Recording Studios, Los Angeles; Bernie Grundman Mastering, Hollywood
- Genre: Film score
- Length: 39:57
- Label: Republic
- Producers: Danny Elfman; Dana Sano

Danny Elfman chronology
Big Eyes (2014)	Fifty Shades of Grey (2015)	Avengers: Age of Ultron (2015)

Fifty Shades of Grey is the soundtrack to the 2015 film Fifty Shades of Grey directed by Sam Taylor-Johnson, starring Dakota Johnson and Jamie Dornan. It is based on E. L. James' 2011 novel of the same name and serves as the first installment in the Fifty Shades film series. The score, composed by Danny Elfman, was released through Republic Records on February 17, 2015.

== Background ==
Danny Elfman composed the music for Fifty Shades of Grey. He initially accepted the offer after his meeting with Taylor-Johnson, for whose photographs he had an affinity. Calling it "just kind of out of the blue", Elfman also noted the challenge that the genre has no musical guide, as the BDSM-centered romance genre was almost non-existent in Hollywood terms, although the novel was popular.

Elfman came up with the blend of romance and spy film elements in music, that provided a way of Anastasia's perspective after she explores the world of Christian Grey. His instrumentation referenced Ana's inner thoughts, in the absence of narration that happened in the book. Elfman also composed for the sequels, which he described as "real fun, stressless scores" that he enjoyed working on a lot.

== Critical reception ==
Filmtracks wrote, "like The Unknown Known, this stuff is pure Elfman, and the light rock highlights of Fifty Shades of Grey are just as comfortable in his career. You have to admire what he managed to achieve with this score, the plot really not meriting more than a phone-in score. Even so, half of the score passes without much notice, leaving the twenty minutes of cool, skittish highlights to carry it to a fourth star." Jonathan Broxton of Movie Music UK wrote, "It's almost a shame that Elfman's generally excellent music accompanies this film, because he actually seems to have understood what the film wanted to be, and has written music to accompany that best case scenario, rather than the tame and turgid melodrama the film actually is; as such, his contribution is likely to be tarred with a similar brush or – dare I say it – whipped with the same flogger. If you can put the fact that this is music for Fifty Shades to the back of your mind, there is a great deal of worthwhile music to be experienced here; better yet, if you do that, you won't have to visit a red room of pain to punish yourself for buying it."

Lindsey Weber of Vulture called it a "goofy" score. Sheri Linden of The Hollywood Reporter wrote "When it's not insistently bland and overused, Danny Elfman's score hits the right notes of heart-thumping dread/excitement, accentuating Anastasia's point of view." Mia Pidlaoan of Screen Rant, while reviewing Elfman's best works, listed the trilogy, including this film, calling it an "inquisitive" score that "gives the movies more depth than what meets the eye."

== Track listing ==
No.	Title	Length
1.	"Shades Of Grey"	2:07
2.	"Ana's Theme"	1:23
3.	"The Red Room"	3:26
4.	"Then Don't!"	2:32
5.	"A Spanking"	2:32
6.	"Going For Coffee"	1:32
7.	"Where Am I?"	1:35
8.	"Ana and Christian"	3:24
9.	"Clean You Up"	2:43
10.	"The Contract"	3:27
11.	"The Art Of War"	3:32
12.	"Did That Hurt?"	2:54
13.	"Bliss"	2:29
14.	"Show Me"	3:02
15.	"Counting To Six"	3:21
16.	"Variations On A Shade"	6:22
Total length:		46:21

== Personnel ==
Credits adapted from liner notes:

- Music composer and producer – Danny Elfman
- Soundtrack producer – Dana Sano
- Additional music – David Buckley
- Programming – Camel Audio, Judd Miller, Jörg Hüttner, Peter Bateman
- Recording and mixing – Noah Snyder
- Score recordist – Adam Michalak
- Recording assistance – Ryan Hopkins
- Mixing assistance – Greg Hayes
- Mastering – Patricia Sullivan
- Music editor – Bill Abbott
- Assistant music editor – Denise Okimoto
- Score editor – David Channing
- MIDI supervision and preparation – Marc Mann
- Auricle control systems – Richard Grant
- Studio technical engineer – Greg Maloney
- Musical assistance – Melissa Karaban
- Music coordinator – Melisa McGregor
- Copyist – Rob Skinnell, Ron Vermillion, Tim Rodier
- Art direction and package design – Jessica Kelly, Sandy Brummels

Orchestra

- Orchestration – Dave Slonaker, Edgardo Simone, Steve Bartek
- Conductor – Pete Anthony
- Orchestra contractor – Gina Zimmitti
- Concertmaster – Bruce Dukov
- Stage crew – David Marquette, Greg Dennen, Greg Loskorn

Instruments

- Bass – Bruce Morgenthaler, Chris Kollgaard, Drew Dembowski, Ed Meares, Mike Valerio, Nico Abondolo, Oscar Hidalgo
- Bass guitar – Chris Chaney
- Bassoon – Rose Corrigan
- Cello – Armen Ksajikian, Cecilia Tsan, Tina Soule, Dennis Karmazyn, Erika Duke-Kirkpatrick, Kim Scholes, Giovanna Clayton, Steve Erdody, Tim Landauer, Tim Loo, Trevor Handy, Vanessa Freebairn-Smith
- Clarinet – Stuart Clark
- Classical piano – TJ Lindgren
- Drums – Josh Freese
- Flute – Heather Clark, Jennifer Olson
- Guitar – Bryce Jacobs, David Levita, George Doering, Mark Tschanz
- Harp – Katie Kirkpatrick
- Piano – TJ Lindgren
- Synth – Judd Miller, Kevin Warren, TJ Lindgren
- Synthesizer – Michael Tuller, Patrick Warren
- Viola – Alma Fernandez, Andrew Duckles, Brian Dembow, Carolyn Riley, Darrin McCann, David Walther, Matt Funes, Rob Brophy, Shawn Mann, Thomas Diener, Vicky Miskolczy
- Violin – Alyssa Park, Ana Landauer, Ben Powell, Bruce Dukov, Carol Pool, Darius Campo, Eun-Mee Ahn, Grace Oh, Irina Voloshina, Jackie Brand, Josefina Vergara, Julie Gigante, Julie Rogers, Katia Popov, Kevin Kumar, Lily Ho Chen, Lucia Micarelli, Maia Jasper, Marc Sazer, Natalie Leggett, Neel Hammond, Nina Evtuhov, Richard Altenbach, Roger Wilkie, Sandy Cameron, Sara Parkins, Sarah Thornblade, Serena McKinney, Songa Lee, Tammy Hatwan

Choir

- Vocal contractor – Bobbi Page
- Alto – Alice Kirwan-Murray, Amy Fogerson, Edie Lehmann Boddicker, Fletcher Sheridan
- Baritone – Aaron Page, Bill Cantos, Gregg Geiger, Guy Maeda, Tim Davis
- Bass – Alvin Chea, Bob Joyce, Mark Beasom, Michael Geiger, Reid Bruton, Will Goldman
- Soprano – Diane Freiman, Elissa Johnston, Karen Whipple Schnurr, Susie Stevens-Logan, Suzanne Waters, Teri Koide, Aleta Braxton-O'Brien, Bobbi Page, Christine Guter, Leanna Brand, Samela Beasom
- Tenor – Arnold Livingston Geis, Dorian Holley, Michael Lichtenauer, Walt Harrah

Management

- Executive in charge of music for Universal Pictures – Mike Knobloch
- Music business affairs for Universal Pictures – Philip M. Cohen
- Music supervision for Universal Pictures – Rachel Levy
- Legal advisor for Republic Records – Christine Calip, Michael Seltzer
- A&R coordinator for Republic Records – Andre Marsh
- A&R for Republic Records – Tom Mackay

== Chart performance ==
Chart (2015)	Peak position
UK Soundtrack Albums (OCC)	13
US Top Soundtracks (Billboard)	15
