= Avengers: Age of Ultron (soundtrack) =

Avengers: Age of Ultron (Original Motion Picture Soundtrack)

Film score by Brian Tyler and Danny Elfman
- Released: April 28, 2015 (Digital); May 19, 2015 (Physical)
- Recorded: 2015
- Studios: Abbey Road Studios; Air Studios
- Genre: Film score
- Length: 77:26
- Labels: Hollywood; Marvel Music
- Producers: Joss Whedon; Kevin Feige; Dave Jordan

Brian Tyler chronology
Furious 7 (2015)	Avengers: Age of Ultron (Original Motion Picture Soundtrack) (2015)	The Disappointments Room (2015)

Danny Elfman chronology
Fifty Shades of Grey (2015)	Avengers: Age of Ultron (2015)	Goosebumps (2015)

Avengers: Age of Ultron (Original Motion Picture Soundtrack) is the film score for the Marvel Studios film, Avengers: Age of Ultron by Brian Tyler and Danny Elfman. Hollywood Records released the album digitally on April 28, 2015, and in physical formats on May 19, 2015.

== Background ==
In March 2014, Brian Tyler signed on to compose the film's score, replacing the composer for the first film, Alan Silvestri, while also marking his third film collaboration with Marvel, following Iron Man 3 and Thor: The Dark World in 2013. Tyler stated that the score pays homage to John Williams' scores for Star Wars, Superman, and Raiders of the Lost Ark, and references the scores for the Iron Man, Thor, and Captain America films in order to create a cohesive musical universe, saying, "That's the goal for sure. You have to build in nostalgia and do it upfront so you can relate to it." Danny Elfman also contributed music to the score, using Silvestri's Avengers theme from the first film to create a new hybrid theme. "The movie is such a large canvas that there were parts that really benefited from his kind of voice," Tyler said of Elfman's contributions. "But also, it needed to all fit together and hang together seamlessly, and that was something we worked really hard on doing."

The score was performed by both the Philharmonia Orchestra and the London Philharmonic Orchestra, and recorded at Abbey Road Studios in early 2015. In April 2015, Marvel released the track listing and announced that the soundtrack would be released in physical media on May 19, 2015, and digitally on April 28, 2015. The following day, a bonus track composed by Elfman, titled "New Avengers-Avengers: Age of Ultron", was revealed.

== Track listing ==
Marvel's Avengers: Age of Ultron track listing
No.	Title	Music	Length
1.	"Avengers: Age of Ultron Title"	Brian Tyler	0:43
2.	"Heroes" (Contains theme from Marvel's The Avengers by Alan Silvestri)	Danny Elfman	2:07
3.	"Rise Together" (Contains theme from Iron Man 3)	Brian Tyler	2:23
4.	"Breaking and Entering"	Brian Tyler	3:04
5.	"It Begins" (Contains theme from Marvel's The Avengers by Alan Silvestri)	Danny Elfman	2:42
6.	"Birth of Ultron"	Brian Tyler	3:05
7.	"Ultron-Twins"	Danny Elfman	4:13
8.	"Hulkbuster" (Contains theme from Iron Man 3)	Brian Tyler	4:32
9.	"Can You Stop This Thing?"	Danny Elfman	1:03
10.	"Sacrifice"	Brian Tyler	2:42
11.	"Farmhouse"	Danny Elfman	4:02
12.	"The Vault"	Brian Tyler	2:58
13.	"The Mission"	Brian Tyler	2:48
14.	"Seoul Searching"	Brian Tyler	2:48
15.	"Inevitability-One Good Eye" (not featured in film. Contains theme from Marvel's The Avengers by Alan Silvestri and theme from Iron Man 3 by Brian Tyler)	Danny Elfman	5:07
16.	"Ultron Wakes"	Danny Elfman	1:43
17.	"Vision"	Brian Tyler	3:47
18.	"The Battle" (Contains theme from Marvel's The Avengers by Alan Silvestri and theme from Thor: The Dark World)	Brian Tyler	4:24
19.	"Wish You Were Here"	Brian Tyler	1:36
20.	"The Farm" (Contains theme from Marvel's The Avengers by Alan Silvestri)	Danny Elfman	1:14
21.	"Darkest of Intentions"	Brian Tyler	2:26
22.	"Fighting Back"	Brian Tyler	2:33
23.	"Avengers Unite" (Contains theme from Marvel's The Avengers by Alan Silvestri)	Danny Elfman	1:08
24.	"Keys to the Past"	Brian Tyler	1:48
25.	"Uprising" (Contains theme from Marvel's The Avengers by Alan Silvestri)	Brian Tyler	2:32
26.	"Outlook" (Contains theme from Marvel's The Avengers by Alan Silvestri)	Brian Tyler	2:38
27.	"The Last One"	Brian Tyler	2:14
28.	"Nothing Lasts Forever" (Contains theme from Marvel's The Avengers by Alan Silvestri)	Danny Elfman	1:57
29.	"New Avengers - Avengers: Age of Ultron" (Contains theme from Marvel's The Avengers by Alan Silvestri)	Danny Elfman	3:09
Total length:			77:26

== Additional music ==
For the Japanese release of the film, Marvel Japan recruited Swedish pop musician Wrethov to compose an original song.

Additional music credited in Avengers: Age of Ultron:

Title	Composer	Performer(s)	Key Scenes/Notes
"Themes from Marvel's The Avengers"	Alan Silvestri		Interpolated throughout the film.
"Norma, Act I: 'Casta Diva'"	Vincenzo Bellini	Maria Callas, Coro Del Teatro Alla Scala, Milano, Orchestra Del Teatro Alla Scala, Milano, Tullio Serafin	Bruce listens to the song on headphones as the Avengers fly back to the Avengers Tower.
"Great Intentions"	Jason French Muniz, Colton Fisher, James Katalbas and Jason Rabinowitz	Damato	During the party at the Avenger Tower.
"Liquid Spirit"	Gregory Porter	Gregory Porter	Plays in the background during the Avengers' victory party.
"I Can't Get Started"	Ira Gershwin, Vernon Duke	BBC Big Band Orchestra	
"Evening of Elegance"	Bill Keis		
"Drum Duel"	Brian Tyler	Brian Tyler	Plays during the contest of lifting Thor's hammer, the Mjolnir.
"I've Got No Strings"	Leigh Harline, Ned Washington	Dickie Jones	After its lyrics are first spoken by Ultron, the song plays as he escapes to Baron Wolfgang von Strucker's Sokovia base. He sings the first few lines later on in the film when he ambushes the Avengers after hijacking the Quinjet.
"Cinderella, Op. 87 Ballet"	Sergei Prokofiev		Plays during Black Widow's flashbacks to her upbringing at the Red Room.
"Berliner Messe: 1. Kyrie"	Arvo Pärt	Estonian Philharmonic Chamber Choir and the Tallinn Chamber Orchestra	Plays during the aftermath of Pietro's death as Wanda confronts and kills Ultron.
"Full Dress Hop"	Gene Krupa, David Roy Eldridge	Gene Krupa & His Orchestra	Plays during Captain America's vision of a party celebrating the end of World War II.

== Charts ==
Weekly chart performance for Avengers: Age of Ultron (Original Motion Picture Soundtrack)
Chart (2015)	Peak position
UK Compilation Albums (OCC)	74
UK Album Downloads (OCC)	85
UK Soundtrack Albums (OCC)	9
