= De Dana Dan =

2009 Indian film by Priyadarshan

- Theatrical release poster
- Directed by: Priyadarshan
- Written by: Suresh Krishnan; Priyadarshan; Jay Master
- Based on: Screwed by Scott Alexander and Larry Karaszewski
- Produced by: Ganesh Jain; Girish Jain; Ratan Jain
- Starring: Akshay Kumar; Suniel Shetty; Katrina Kaif; Sameera Reddy; Paresh Rawal; Shakti Kapoor; Asrani
- Narrated by: Akshay Kumar
- Cinematography: N. K. Ekambaram
- Edited by: Arun Kumar
- Music by: Score: Salim–Sulaiman; Songs: Pritam; Rhythm Dhol Bass; Ad Boyz
- Production companies: Eros International; Venus Films
- Distributed by: Baba Arts; Hari Om Entertainment
- Release date: 27 November 2009
- Running time: 167 minutes
- Country: India
- Language: Hindi
- Budget: ₹60 crore
- Box office: ₹78.8 crore

De Dana Dan (Back to Back) is a 2009 Indian Hindi-language comedy film directed by Priyadarshan. It is a partial adaptation of the Hollywood film Screwed; some scenes were taken from the 2004 film Vettam, directed by Priyadarshan himself. The film has an ensemble cast consisting of Akshay Kumar, Sunil Shetty, Katrina Kaif, Paresh Rawal, Sameera Reddy and Neha Dhupia. Released on 27 November 2009, it was moderately successful at the box office.

== Plot ==
Nitin Bankar is a servant and driver for Kuljeet Kaur. Kuljeet owns malls, restaurants, and other real estate in Singapore. Nitin dislikes Kuljeet's dog, Moolchand Ji, who gets him in trouble. His friend, Ram Mishra, works for a courier service after moving to Singapore to work in Chinese films. Anjali Kakkar is in love with Nitin, and Manpreet Oberoi is in love with Ram. Both girlfriends are wealthy and accustomed to the good life.

Inspector Wilson Parera is investigating Harbans Chadda for cheque kiting. Harbans wants to marry off his son, Nonny, so he can obtain a dowry and pay his debts. He agrees to Nonny's marriage to Anjali after her father, Himanshu, who hates Nitin, brings up the subject. At a restaurant, Harbans misses meeting Anjali because Wilson is there; Himanshu meets Pammi Chadda, Harbans' younger second wife. Anjali tells Nonny that she is pregnant with her lover's child to get out of the wedding since she loves Nitin.

At a casino, Harbans meets Brij Mohan Oberoi, who introduces Indian ambassador Paramjeet Singh Lamba to everyone there. After learning about Oberoi's wealth, Harbans arranges Nonny's marriage to Manpreet. Himanshu, who was not informed, arranges Anjali's marriage to someone else. Moosa Heerapoorwala decides to marry Anu Chopra, a dancer at the casino. After his brother-in-law finds out, he hires Mafia don Maamu to kill Moosa. Maamu sends Kaala Krishna Murali, his best assassin, to do the job. To hide from his wife, Moosa books a hotel room as Subair.

Nitin and Ram decide to kidnap Moolchand and ransom him for money. When they reach the hotel, they realize that the dog has escaped and returned home, causing the public and police to think that Nitin has been kidnapped. Anjali runs away from home and goes to their room. Kuljeet initially refuses to pay the ransom but relents when her customers stage a boycott. Nitin does not want to return to Kuljeet, so they decide to obtain a dead body from Maamu (who happens to be Ram's friend) and throw it onto the railway tracks with Nitin's driving license to suggest that the kidnappers killed Nitin.

Harbans' and Oberoi's families come to the hotel for the wedding, as do Kaala, Wilson, Moosa and Anu. Harbans and Oberoi take a photo to celebrate their families' union. Nitin waits at the hotel entrance with a white orchid in his hand for Maamu's man to come for the advance money to arrange a dead body. Himanshu arrives at the hotel and chases Nitin into Harbans' room. Nitin, unable to hide under the bed, as a waiter who is threatened to be fired should he make one more mistake is there, hides in a wardrobe. Harbans locks his cellphone (and Nitin) in the wardrobe. Himanshu mistakes Nitin's room for Lamba's and attacks him and his wife. After that, a lot of mistaken identities take place.

Nitin calls Ram and tells him to give an advance to Maamu's man, but Ram mistakenly gives it to Kaala. Nonny sees Anjali, and informs his father, who agrees to return their money to her. Harbans mistakes Anu for Anjali, which causes confusion. Moosa's photo is accidentally exchanged with one of Oberoi, which results in Kaala believing he needs to kill Oberoi. Pammi demands money from Harbans to buy clothing and jewelry, but wants to elope with Arjun. Harbans asks her to take money from Lamba, and she mistakes Moosa for Lamba. Moosa tries to molest Pammi, which makes Harbans angry with Lamba. Anu mistakes Lamba for Moosa and tries to get close to him; after getting caught, she says that Lamba promised to marry her or give her money.

Wilson reaches Harbans' room with Lamba's help and looks for Harbans. He opens the wardrobe, finds Nitin, and mistakes him for Harbans. Kaala attempts to kill Oberoi by dropping a bomb in his suitcase, but is knocked unconscious by a falling window and falls onto Nitin and Ram's truck while they are on their way to collect Kuljeet's ransom. They collect it, but Nitin is left behind and brought to the hospital; Ram gets the money and reaches the hotel, and Kaala is assumed to be the kidnapper (since he was on the truck). The police then mistake that Kaala's name is Harbans and go to the hotel to arrest Kaala. Maamu arrives at the hotel with a body that nobody wants, while Oberoi realizes Harbans' lies. Due to the police thinking Harbans kidnapped Nitin, Oberoi, Lamba, Wilson, the police, Moosa (who believes he took money for him and is working with Anu), and Kuljeet all chase him and Kaala, while Maamu and Himanshu chase Nitin, Ram, Anjali, and Manpreet. Anu also becomes involved in the chase after believing the people chasing Harbans are actually looking for her.

The chase ends at the roof of the hotel, where during the chaos, Oberoi's suitcase is tossed into the water tank as Kaala's bomb detonates and explodes, bursting the water pipes and flooding the entire hotel to the brim. Nitin, Anjali, Ram, and Manpreet, initially unable to find the money, sadly decide to split ways, but Nitin spots the suitcase and calls them back, which changes their moods to happiness.

== Cast ==
- Akshay Kumar as Nitin Bankar
- Suniel Shetty as Ram Mishra
- Paresh Rawal as Harbans Chaddha, Nonny's father and Pammi's husband
- Katrina Kaif as Anjali Kakkar, Nitin's love interest (Voice dubbed by Mona Ghosh Shetty)
- Sameera Reddy as Manpreet Oberoi, Ram's love interest
- Neha Dhupia as Anu Chopra, a casino dancer
- Tinnu Anand as Himanshu Kakkar, Anjali's father
- Rajpal Yadav as Dagdu Yadav, a waiter
- Manoj Joshi as Brijmohan Oberoi, Manpreet's father
- Archana Puran Singh as Kuljeet Kaur
- Aditi Govitrikar as Pammi Chadda, Harbans' second wife and Nonny's step-mother
- Asrani as Maamu Lee Chan, a ruthless crime boss
- Chunky Pandey as Nonny Chadda, Harbans' son
- Johnny Lever as Kaala Krishna Murari, Maamu's henchman
- Shakti Kapoor as Moosa Hirapurwala / Subair
- Vikram Gokhale as Paramjeet Singh Lamba, Kamini's husband and the Indian ambassador
- Supriya Karnik as Kamini Lamba, Oberoi's sister-in-law and Lamba's wife
- Sharat Saxena as CBI Inspector Wilson Perera
- Archana Suseelan as the hotel receptionist
- Satish Nagpal as the hotel manager
- Swatantra Bharat as Goon

== Production ==
=== Casting ===
De Dana Dan reunited Akshay Kumar, Sunil Shetty and Paresh Rawal with Priyadarshan, who directed them in the first Hera Pheri film. It was the first time the trio acted together after Phir Hera Pheri in 2006, although Rawal and Shetty appeared in Priyadarshan's Hulchul and Chup Chup Ke. Akshay and Rawal also appeared in Priyadarshan's Bhagam Bhag and Garam Masala. Asin Thottumkal was approached for a role in the film initially.

The character names Nitin Bankar and Ram Mishra, portrayed by Akshay Kumar and Sunil Shetty respectively, refer to two of the film's long-serving stand-ins.

=== Filming ===
Filming began on 1 December 2008 at Mehboob Studio in Mumbai. The entire movie was filmed in Singapore, primarily at the Pan Pacific Hotel, except for the climax. The climax was shot in Film City, Goregaon, Mumbai, where a replica of the Pan Pacific Hotel from Singapore was created. The flood scene was completed in 15 days. At last, the film took 80 days to complete.

== Release ==
The film was released on 27 November 2009 globally.

=== Home media ===
De Dana Dan was released on DVD, with a running time of 167 minutes.

== Reception ==
=== Box office ===
De Dana Dan earned ₹220 million in its opening weekend in India, the tenth-biggest opening weekend of all time when it was released. The film earned ₹341.9 million at the end of its first week, and over ₹650 million by the end of its run in India.

It debuted in ninth place in the UK, earning £308,029 (about ₹23.4 million) on 48 screens in its opening weekend; the per-screen average was £6,417. The film debuted in 20th place in the US, earning $772,377 (about ₹35.7 million) on 69 screens in its opening weekend; the per-screen average was $11,194. It debuted in 12th place in Australia, earning $96,597 (about ₹4,096,000) on 14 screens in its opening weekend; the per-screen average was $6,900. The film earned £560,943 at the end of its UK run, and $944,979 at the end of its US run; at the end of its Australian run, it collected $200,000.

=== Critical response ===
The film received mixed reviews from critics, who praised its performances, humor, cinematography, climax visuals and score but criticized its screenplay, narration and pace.

== Soundtrack ==
De Dana Dan

Soundtrack album by Pritam
- Released: 2 November 2009
- Genre: Feature film soundtrack
- Length: 51:21
- Label: Ishtar Music

Pritam chronology
Tum Mile (2009)	De Dana Dan (2009)	Toh Baat Pakki! (2010)

RDB chronology
Kambakkht Ishq (2009)	De Dana Dan (2009)

No.	Title	Lyrics	Artist(s)	Length
1.	"Rishte Naate"	Sayeed Quadri	Rahat Fateh Ali Khan, Suzanne D'Mello, Akshay Kumar, Katrina Kaif, Suniel Shetty, Sameera Reddy	4:42
2.	"Paisa Paisa (Composed by RDB, Music Produced by Pritam) "	Manak-E, RDB, Selina	Manak-E, RDB, Selina, Akshay Kumar, Katrina Kaif, Suniel Shetty, Sameera Reddy	3:54
3.	"Gale Lag Ja"	Ashish Pandit	Javed Ali, Banjyotsna	4:12
4.	"Baamulaiza"	Irshad Kamil	Mika Singh, Dominique Cerejo, Style Bhai, Akshay Kumar, Katrina Kaif, Suniel Shetty, Sameera Reddy	4:50
5.	"Hotty Naughty"	Neeraj Shridhar	Sunidhi Chauhan	3:38
6.	"Rishte Naate" (Remix)	Sayeed Quadri	Kunal Ganjawala, Suzanne D'Mello, Akshay Kumar, Katrina Kaif, Suniel Shetty, Sameera Reddy	4:25
7.	"Baamulaiza" (Ragga Mix)	Irshad Kamil	Mika Singh, Dominique, Cerejo, Style Bhai, Akshay Kumar, Katrina Kaif, Suniel Shetty, Sameera Reddy	5:17
8.	"Gale Lag Ja" (Version 2)	Ashish Pandit	Javed Ali, Banjyotsna, Dominique Cerejo	4:22
9.	"Hotty Naughty (Remix)"	Neeraj Shridhar	Kalpana Patowary	3:46
10.	"Baamulaiza (Remix)"	Irshad Kamil	Mika Singh, Dominique Cerejo, Style Bhai, Akshay Kumar, Katrina Kaif, Suniel Shetty, Sameera Reddy	4:24
11.	"De Dana Dan (Composed by Ad Boys)"	Sameer	Ad Boys	4:06
12.	"Paisa Paisa (Club Mix) (Composed by RDB)"	Manak-E, RDB, Selina	Manak-E, RDB, Selina, Akshay Kumar, Katrina Kaif, Suniel Shetty, Sameera Reddy

=== Theme song ===
"Paisa Paisa" ("Tu, paisa paisa karti hai, tu paise pe kyun marti hai") is the film's theme song. It was produced by Pritam, composed and sung by RDB, and performed by Akshay Kumar and Katrina Kaif and Suniel Shetty and Sameera Reddy.

The song was conceived to illustrate that money was the driving force of the film's plot. It incorporated comedic lyrics with sound effects and a "slight R&B touch", making it upbeat, danceable, and memorable. Sung by Punjabi singer Manak-e, it was composed for De Dana Dan by RDB; the rest of its music was composed by Pritam. The music is based on "Yeah", Usher's hit song. Originally sung by Manak-e in Punjabi several years earlier on his album, Akshay Kumar asked for the song to be re-composed and re-released with Hindi and Punjabi lyrics by RDB. "Paisa Paisa" was chosen as the film's theme song because it was light and upbeat.

==== Reception ====
The Times of India reported in late November 2009 that the song (released before De Dana Dan) was gaining attention and "rocking the charts". Before the film's release, it was considered one of its "fast catching numbers" and a version was used in the Jharkhand election campaign. According to Glamsham, "'Paisa Paisa" from De Dana Dan is a chartbuster and is igniting the music charts." In December 2009, Daily News & Analysis reported that "Paisa Paisa" was favoured to be popular during party season. It was later reported that although De Dana Dan did not do as well as expected at the box office, "Paisa Paisa" helped locate a lost, mentally-challenged child when police were informed that the child continually hummed the song.
