= Walter Keane =

American plagiarist (1915–2000)

- Born: Walter Stanley Keane; October 7, 1915; Lincoln, Nebraska, U.S.
- Died: December 27, 2000 (aged 85); Encinitas, California, U.S.
- Known for: Plagiarism
- Spouses: Barbara Ingham (div. 1952) Margaret Hawkins (m. 1955; div. 1965): Joan Mervin

Walter Stanley Keane (October 7, 1915 – December 27, 2000) was an American plagiarist who became famous in the 1960s as the claimed painter of a series of widely reproduced paintings depicting vulnerable subjects with enormous eyes. The paintings are now accepted as having been painted by his then-wife, Margaret Keane.

Walter and Margaret had married in 1955, where Walter soon became jealous of Margaret's artwork. He soon began claiming her artwork as his, making her work 16 hours a day to provide art that he would present as his own. Per Margaret: "When he wasn’t home he’d usually call every hour to make sure I hadn’t gone out [...] I was in jail." The money acquired from this artwork went to Walter instead of Margaret, and he lived extravagantly while she was left unrecognized. Even when she offered to teach him how to paint it himself, he failed to be able to do so. Margaret felt trapped in this relationship and felt she needed to stay to support herself and her daughter. In the meantime, Walter continuously cheated on his wife and drank alcohol in excess. He threatened to have her "knocked off" if she left him, and he didn't allow her to have friends.

Margaret and Walter divorced in 1965, which finally gave Margaret the freedom to live a more peaceful life in Hawaii. In 1970, Margaret shared everything with a UPI reporter - to which Walter called her a "boozing, sex-starved psychopath." Eventually, the situation escalated when USA Today ran a story stating that Margaret claimed Walter's paintings as her own. In 1986, Margaret Keane sued Walter and USA Today. In the subsequent slander suit, the judge demanded that the litigants paint a painting in the courtroom, but Walter declined, citing a sore shoulder. Margaret then produced a painting for the jurors in 53 minutes. The jury awarded her damages of $4 million.

== Biography ==
Keane was born in Lincoln, Nebraska, on October 7, 1915, one of 10 children from his father's second marriage. His mother, Alma Christina (Johnson) Keane, was from Denmark, and his father, William Robert Keane, was of Irish descent. Keane grew up near the center of Lincoln and made money by selling shoes. In the early 1930s, he moved to Los Angeles, California, where he attended Los Angeles City College. He moved to Berkeley, California, in the 1940s with his wife, Barbara (née Ingham), and went into real estate; both were real estate brokers.

Their first child, a son, died shortly after birth in the hospital. Later, they had a healthy baby girl.

In July 1948, Walter and Barbara bought the stately John J. Cairns House at 2729 Elmwood Avenue, designed by Berkeley architect Walter H. Ratcliff Jr. In 1948, the Keanes traveled to Europe, living in Heidelberg and later Paris. When they returned to their home in Berkeley, they began an educational toy business, "Susie Keane's Puppeteens", teaching children French through the use of handmade puppets, phonograph records and a book. The "ballroom" of their large home became an assembly line of hand-painted wooden puppets, with various intricately made costumes. The puppets were sold in high-end stores such as Saks Fifth Avenue.

Barbara Keane later became head of her own department in dress design at the University of California, Berkeley. Walter Keane subsequently closed both his real estate firm and the toy company in order to work full-time on his painting. Their marriage ended in divorce in 1952.

At a fairground in 1953, Walter met an artist making charcoal sketches, Margaret (Doris Hawkins) Ulbrich. They married in 1955 and separated on November 1, 1964. During their marriage, and for a time afterward, Walter sold his wife's highly stylized "big eyes" paintings as his own. In doing so, he made millions of dollars over the years. The film Big Eyes depicts the story in detail.

Walter married his third wife, Joan Mervin, after divorcing Margaret in 1965. They had two children in the early 1970s, while living in London. This marriage also ended in divorce.

Keane died at the age of 85 in Encinitas, California on December 27, 2000.

== Art career ==
Keane first displayed Margaret's paintings as his own work in 1957, at an outdoor art show in Washington Square in Manhattan. A principal venue for his sales was the Hungry i, a comedy club in San Francisco. The paintings swiftly gained a following. In 1961, The Prescolite Manufacturing Corporation bought "Our Children" and presented it to the United Nations Children's Fund; it is in the United Nations permanent collection of art.

From 1959 to 1965, Keane had an art gallery in New York in addition to his main gallery in San Francisco. The first New York gallery was located at 749 Madison Avenue and then he relocated to 798 Madison Avenue.

In 1965, Keane was named "one of the most controversial and most successful painters at work today". Artworks credited to him were owned by many celebrities and hanging in a number of permanent collections.

In an interview with LIFE magazine in 1965, Keane claimed his inspiration for the big-eyed children came when he was in Europe as an art student:

"My psyche was scarred in my art student days in Europe, just after World War II, by an ineradicable memory of war-wracked innocents. In their eyes lurk all of mankind's questions and answers. If mankind would look deep into the soul of the very young, he wouldn't need a road map. I wanted other people to know about those eyes, too. I want my paintings to clobber you in the heart and make you yell, 'DO SOMETHING!'"

In the same interview, Keane claimed: "Nobody could paint eyes like El Greco, and nobody can paint eyes like Walter Keane."

In 1970, Margaret Keane announced on a radio broadcast that she was the real creator of the paintings. The Keanes continued to dispute the paintings' origin.

In 1986, after Walter suggested that Margaret claimed she was the painter only because she believed he was dead, she sued him in federal court for slander. At the hearing, the judge ordered both Margaret and Walter to create a big-eyed child painting in the courtroom. Walter declined to paint before the court, citing a sore shoulder, whereas Margaret completed her painting in 53 minutes. After three weeks of trial, a jury awarded Margaret US$4 million in damages (equivalent to $12 million in 2025).

In 1990, a federal appeals court upheld the verdict of defamation but overturned the $4 million damage award. Margaret decided not to appeal for the money: "I didn't care about the money. I just wanted to establish the fact that I did the paintings."

== In pop culture ==
Tim Burton directed and produced the 2014 film Big Eyes based on Margaret Keane's life. It was released in theaters in December 2014, with Amy Adams playing Margaret and Christoph Waltz playing Walter Keane. Adams won a Golden Globe Award for her performance.

== Bibliography ==
- "Keane Perceptions". December 12, 1993. View, Part E, page 6. Archived from the original on November 4, 2012.
- Kunen, James S. (June 23, 1986). "Margaret Keane's Artful Case Proves That She—and Not Her Ex-Husband—made Waifs". People. Vol. 25 No. 25.
- "Artist Wins Suit". The Pittsburgh Press. June 5, 1986.
- UPI (October 17, 1970). "Controversial 'eyes'". Montreal Gazette. p. 44.
- "Double Image". Youngstown Vindicator. December 10, 1961.
- "Artist Challenges Ex-husband To Solve 'big Eye' Controversy". Lakeland Ledger. July 11, 1984.
- "The lady behind those Keane-eyed kids". Life Magazine. November 20, 1970. Vol. 69, No. 21 - p. 56.
- "Playboy Prince Says He's a Loner". The Modesto Bee. July 11, 1984.
- Eve M. Kahn (May 15, 2014). "Behind The Sad Eyes". The New York Times.
- Dan Levy (January 4, 2001). "Keane, Artist Associated With Big-Eyed Portraits". SF Chronicle.
