= Big Eyes =

2014 film by Tim Burton

- Theatrical release poster
- Directed by: Tim Burton
- Written by: Scott Alexander; Larry Karaszewski
- Produced by: Tim Burton; Scott Alexander; Larry Karaszewski; Lynette Howell
- Starring: Amy Adams; Christoph Waltz; Danny Huston; Jon Polito; Krysten Ritter; Jason Schwartzman; Terence Stamp
- Cinematography: Bruno Delbonnel
- Edited by: JC Bond
- Music by: Danny Elfman
- Production companies: Electric City Entertainment; Silverwood Films; Tim Burton Productions
- Distributed by: The Weinstein Company
- Release dates: December 15, 2014 (New York City); December 25, 2014 (United States)
- Running time: 106 minutes
- Country: United States
- Language: English
- Budget: $10 million
- Box office: $29.3 million

Big Eyes is a 2014 American biographical drama film directed by Tim Burton, written by Scott Alexander and Larry Karaszewski, and starring Amy Adams and Christoph Waltz. It is about the relationship between American artist Margaret Keane and her second husband, Walter Keane, who in the 1950s and 1960s took credit for Margaret's phenomenally popular paintings of people with big eyes.

The film had its world premiere in New York City on December 15, 2014, and was released in the United States by The Weinstein Company on December 25, 2014. It was met with generally favorable reviews, with particular praise given to the performances of Adams and Waltz and performed moderately well at the box office, grossing $29 million worldwide against the budget of $10 million. Adams won the Golden Globe Award for Best Actress – Motion Picture Comedy or Musical and received a nomination for the BAFTA for Best Actress in a Leading Role. Waltz was also nominated for a Golden Globe for his performance, and Lana Del Rey received a Golden Globe nomination for the film's title song, "Big Eyes".

== Plot ==
In 1958, Margaret Ulbrich leaves her then-husband Frank and takes her young daughter Jane to North Beach, San Francisco, where she gets a job painting illustrations at a furniture factory. While doing portraits at an outdoor art show, she meets Walter Keane, who sells paintings of Parisian street scenes but makes his money in real estate. They soon become close friends. Margaret is distraught when her ex-husband, Jane's father, asks for custody of Jane as part of the divorce settlement. Walter proposes, and they marry and honeymoon in Hawaii. She retains custody of Jane.

Unable to get his or Margaret's paintings into a fine art gallery, Walter convinces Enrico Banducci, the owner of a popular jazz club, to rent him some wall space to exhibit their work. A customer sees one of Margaret's big eyes paintings and her husband buys it for her. The husband mistakenly assumes that Walter created the painting, and Walter does not deny being the painter of the work. Walter is frustrated when the designated space is in the back by the bathrooms. He fights with Banducci and puts the man's head through one of Margaret's canvases. This becomes a front-page story in a local newspaper, which packs the club with people curious to see the art that made grown men fight. Dick Nolan, a celebrity gossip columnist, wants to know more about the artwork and proceeds to ask about Margaret's paintings of young girls with big eyes---assumning that Walter, not Margaret, actually created them. Walter goes along with the misunderstanding, failing to clarify that they are Margaret's creations. Afterward, he shows Margaret how much money he made selling her work and suggests they team up, with her staying at home painting and him taking credit and handling publicity and sales.

Walter opens his own gallery selling Margaret's art and eventually comes up with the idea of making cheap reproductions of Margaret's works, which sell in huge numbers. The family moves into a mansion. Walter spends his time hobnobbing with celebrities while Margaret is stuck at home, feeling increasingly isolated. He even makes Margaret lie to Jane about who is doing the paintings.

One day, she finds a crate full of paintings of Parisian street scenes, all signed "S. CENIC". She realizes that she has never actually seen Walter paint and discovers that he has been painting over the name of the original artist and claiming these paintings as his own. When confronted, he says he always wanted to be an artist but never had the talent.

Disillusioned, Margaret indicates that she is losing her interest in continuing the ruse, so Walter threatens to have her killed. Later, he tells her of his plan to get a painting displayed at the upcoming New York World's Fair and demands Margaret paint her "masterpiece". Jane sneaks into the studio when Margaret is working on the huge painting, "Tomorrow Forever", and says she already knew Margaret was really the artist.

At a party, Walter becomes angry after reading John Canaday's scathing review of "Tomorrow Forever", which leads the Fair not to exhibit the painting, and confronts the critic. At home, he drunkenly blames Margaret for the failure of the painting and becomes violent. Along with her daughter, she runs and locks them both in the studio in an attempt to stay away from harm. He then starts throwing lit matches through the studio's keyhole at her and Jane. As he continues to throw lit matches and nearly sets the house on fire, both Margaret and Jane manage to escape, take the car, and drive away from home.

One year later, Margaret and Jane have settled in Honolulu, Hawaii. Walter says he will only grant Margaret a divorce if she signs over the rights to every painting and produces 100 more. Initially, Margaret agrees, but her growing interest in the Jehovah's Witnesses convinces her of the importance of honesty. She finally signs a batch of paintings with her own name. Later, on a Hawaiian radio show, she reveals that she is the real artist behind the "big eyes" paintings, which makes national news. Dick Nolan publishes Walter's claims that Margaret is delusional. On Jane's suggestion, Margaret sues Walter for slander, and Nolan's newspaper for libel.

At the trial, the judge immediately dismisses the libel suit against the newspaper. Nolan and his attorneys bail, leaving Walter to defend himself against the slander charge without legal representation. Walter botches his defense, even mimicking in court what he has gathered from watching Perry Mason episodes on TV. When he proceeds to cross-examine himself as a witness, the judge becomes fed up and directs both Margaret and Walter to create a painting in court to prove who the real artist is. Whereas Margaret paints steadily, Walter stalls before claiming his arm hurts too much to hold a paintbrush. Margaret wins the lawsuit, and a fan asks her to sign a copy of Walter's coffee table book.

A textual epilogue reveals that Walter, despite continuing to insist that he was the true artist, never produced another painting and died penniless while Margaret remarried, moved back to San Francisco, and opened a new gallery.

== Cast ==
- Amy Adams as Margaret Keane
- Christoph Waltz as Walter Keane
- Danny Huston as Dick Nolan
- Krysten Ritter as Dee-Ann
- Jason Schwartzman as Ruben
- Terence Stamp as John Canaday
- Jon Polito as Enrico Banducci
- Delaney Raye as Young Jane
- Madeleine Arthur as Older Jane
- James Saito as Judge
- Dylan Kingwell as Boy at Art Show (in the park)

== Production ==
Writers Scott Alexander and Larry Karaszewski negotiated with Margaret Keane over her life rights and wrote Big Eyes as a spec script. In October 2007, it was announced that development was moving forward with Alexander and Karaszewski directing their script, and nightclub operator Andrew Meieran fully financing, through his Bureau of Moving Pictures banner, the under-$20 million budget. Kate Hudson and Thomas Haden Church were set to star, and filming was to begin in June 2008, before being pushed back for reasons related to a new Screen Actors Guild contract.

In September 2010, it was announced that Tim Burton had become involved with the film as a producer. Principal photography was scheduled to start in April 2012, with Reese Witherspoon and Ryan Reynolds attached to star. By 2013, Burton had taken over directing and Big Eyes was set up at The Weinstein Company, with Amy Adams and Christoph Waltz starring. Filming began in July 2013. Principal photography began on July 8, 2013 and completed on August 23, 2013. Big Eyes is Burton's first film since Edward Scissorhands (1990) to be edited by someone other than Chris Lebenzon, who was busy with Maleficent the same year. Keane's paintings were recreated by prop artist Lisa Godwin, who made considerable effort to imitate Keane's style without directly copying any given painting.

== Soundtrack ==
It was reported in November 2014 that singer Lana Del Rey would contribute with two original songs to the soundtrack, and the songs "Big Eyes" and "I Can Fly", which Lana Del Rey wrote and performed, were leaked in December 2014. The soundtrack album and both songs were officially released on December 23, 2014.

== Reception ==
=== Box office ===
The film earned $3 million during its opening weekend and grossed $14.5 million in North America, and $14.8 million internationally, for a worldwide total gross of $29.3 million.

=== Critical reception ===
On Rotten Tomatoes, Big Eyes holds an approval rating of 72%, based on 198 reviews, with an average rating of 6.7/10; the site's consensus reads: "Well-acted, thought-provoking, and a refreshing change of pace for Tim Burton, Big Eyes works both as a biopic and as a timelessly relevant piece of social commentary". On Metacritic, the film has a score of 62 out of 100, based on 40 critics, indicating "generally favorable" reviews.

The Philadelphia Inquirer's Steven Rea awarded the film three-and-a-half stars out of four, praising Adams' and Waltz's performances and the film's themes. Peter Travers of Rolling Stone criticized the film's uneven tone and pacing, but admitted it was a "heartfelt tribute to the yearning that drives even the most marginalized artist to self expression no matter what the hell anyone thinks."

=== Controversy ===
The film's treatment of art critic John Canaday, played by Terence Stamp, prompted discussion among critics about the artistic merit of Margaret Keane's paintings independent of the deception surrounding their authorship. Canaday had condemned the paintings in 1964, when they were publicly attributed to Walter Keane. Several reviews of Big Eyes revisited his judgment. Ann Hornaday of The Washington Post cited Canaday while discussing the film's questions about criticism and populism: "Canaday fulminates against the works of an 'appalling, grotesque, tasteless hack.' This is why society needs critics, he rants, 'to protect them from such atrocities.' (Amen, brother.)" By contrast, Geoffrey Macnab of The Independent writes that "we can't help but feel a sympathy for [Walter] when he is being sneered at by Canaday," despite the fact that Walter did not create the art.

Feminist art critic Jan Lisa Huttner, who championed Big Eyes upon its release, argued instead that contemporary discussion of Canaday's judgment overlooked the significance of the paintings' true authorship. Huttner noted that Canaday died in 1985, a year before Margaret Keane established her authorship in court, and therefore never knew that the paintings he had criticized as Walter Keane's work had actually been created by Margaret. She wrote:

Canaday’s evisceration of the Big Eyes paintings was based on the assumption that the painter was Walter and Walter was obviously a fake and a fraud. True enough! But the whole point of Big Eyes was to prove that the real painter, Margaret, was utterly sincere and had created works of art that captured all her suppressed inner emotion.

Huttner returned to the film for a tenth-anniversary screening at the 2024 SWAN Day Sweet 16 event at the SVA Theatre in Manhattan. During a Q&A following the screening, co-screenwriter Larry Karaszewski told Huttner that "You were the person who understood this movie better than anybody else at that time period."

In 2026, Keane's paintings were included in the Lucas Museum of Narrative Art, in the "Childhood" section of the museum. Museum founder George Lucas has described his approach to art as inclusive of works outside the traditional fine-art canon, stating that “art is in the eye of the beholder” and that “if it's emotional to you, it's art.”

=== Awards and nominations ===
Association	Date of ceremony	Category	Nominee(s)	Result	Ref.
British Academy Film Awards	February 8, 2015	Best Actress in a Leading Role	Amy Adams	Nominated	
British Academy Film Awards	February 8, 2015	Best Production Design	Rick Heinrichs, Shane Vieau	Nominated	
Casting Society of America	January 22, 2015	Studio or Independent Comedy	Jeanne McCarthy, Nicole Abellera, Coreen Mayrs, Heike Brandstatter	Nominated	
Critics' Choice Awards	January 15, 2015	Best Song	Lana Del Rey for "Big Eyes"	Nominated	
Golden Globe Awards	January 11, 2015	Best Actor – Comedy or Musical	Christoph Waltz	Nominated	
Golden Globe Awards	January 11, 2015	Best Actress – Comedy or Musical	Amy Adams	Won	
Golden Globe Awards	January 11, 2015	Best Original Song	Lana Del Rey for "Big Eyes"	Nominated	
Independent Spirit Awards	February 21, 2015	Best Screenplay	Scott Alexander and Larry Karaszewski	Nominated	
Broadcast Film Critics Association Awards	January 15, 2015	Critics' Choice Movie Award for Best Song	Lana Del Rey for "Big Eyes"	Nominated	
Capri Hollywood International Film Festival	2015	Capri Actress Award	Amy Adams	Won	
CINE Golden Eagle Film and Video Competition	2015	Narrative Content: Feature - Live Action	The Weinstein Company	Nominated	
Gold Derby Awards	2015	Original Song	Lana Del Rey, Daniel Heath	Nominated	
Golden Trailer Awards	2015	Best Independent TV Spot	The Weinstein Company, Trailer Park	Nominated	
Houston Film Critics Society Awards	2015	Best Original Song	Lana Del Rey, Daniel Heath	Nominated	
Italian Online Movie Awards	2015	Best Costume Design	Colleen Atwood	Nominated	
Online Film & Television Association	2015	Best Actress	Amy Adams	Nominated	
Online Film & Television Association	2015	Best Music, Original Song	Lana Del Rey, Daniel Heath	Nominated	

== See also ==
- "Big Eyes" – 2014 title track by Lana Del Rey
