= Margaret Keane =

American artist (1927–2022)

- Keane at her art studio
- Born: Peggy Doris Hawkins; September 15, 1927; Nashville, Tennessee, U.S.
- Died: June 26, 2022 (aged 94); Napa, California, U.S.
- Other names: Peggy Ulbrich; MDH Keane; Margaret McGuire
- Occupation: Artist
- Spouses: Frank Richard Ulbrich (m. 1948; div. 1955); Walter Keane (m. 1955; div. 1965); Daniel Francis McGuire (m. 1970; died 1983)
- Children: 1
- Website: www.keane-eyes.com

Margaret D. H. Keane (born Margaret Doris Hawkins; September 15, 1927 – June 26, 2022) was an American artist known for her paintings of subjects with big eyes. She mainly painted women, children, or animals in oil or mixed media. The work achieved commercial success through inexpensive reproductions on prints, plates, and cups. The artwork was originally attributed to Keane's then-husband, Walter Keane. Soon after their divorce in the 1960s, Margaret claimed credit, which was established after a courtroom "paint-off" in Hawaii, in which Walter refused to participate.

A resurgence of interest in Margaret Keane's work followed the release of Tim Burton's 2014 biopic Big Eyes. She maintained a gallery in San Francisco which boasts "the largest collection of Margaret Keane's art in the entire world." In light of the great gulf between her work's popularity and its critical lampooning, she was sometimes referred to as the "Wayne Newton of the art world."

== Early life ==
Margaret Doris Hawkins was born elder of the two children of David Hawkins and Jessie (McBurnett) Hawkins on September 15, 1927, in Nashville, Tennessee. When she was two, one eardrum was permanently damaged during a mastoid operation. Unable to hear properly, she learned to watch the eyes of the person talking to her to understand them. She and her brother David studied in public schools. Keane started drawing as a child and, at age 10, she took classes at the Watkins Institute in Nashville. When she was 10 years old, Keane painted her first oil portrait of two little girls, one crying and one laughing, and gave the painting to her grandmother.

At age 18, she attended the Traphagen School of Design in New York City for a year. She began work painting clothing and baby cribs in the 1950s until she finally began a career painting portraits. Early on, Margaret began experimenting in kitsch. She worked in both acrylic and oil-based paints, with the subject of her artwork limited to women, children, and familiar animals (cats, dogs, horses).

== Career ==
=== Career with Walter Keane ===
Some time in the mid-1950s, Margaret, married with a child, met Walter Keane. At the height of his popularity, Walter said he saw her sitting alone at a well known North Beach bistro and he was attracted by her large eyes. At the time Walter was also married and working as a real estate salesman, while painting on the side. However, he later told reporters that he had given up his "highly successful real estate career" in 1947. Margaret found him "suave, gregarious and charming." The two married in 1955 in Honolulu.

Margaret said that he began selling her characteristic "big eyes" paintings immediately but, unknown to her, claimed it was his own work. A principal venue for his sales was the hungry i, a jazz club in San Francisco. When she discovered his deception, she remained silent. She later explained her behavior: "I was afraid of him because he [threatened] to have me done in if I said anything." Margaret publicly acknowledged him as the artist, later saying it was "torturous" for her. She rationalized the situation on the ground that "[a]t least they were being shown."

In 1957, Walter began exhibiting the "big eyes" paintings as his own. In February, the work was shown on a wall of the Bank of America in Sausalito. He took nine paintings to New Orleans, which he claimed to have sold during Mardi Gras. That summer, Walter arranged for a showing at the Washington Square Park Outdoor Art show in New York City. Displaying his talent for promotion, during that trip he arranged for a showing in August at the Sheraton Hotel in Chicago and another in a small East Side gallery for the same month. Walter began developing a myth about himself, and to a lesser extent, Margaret. He eventually began to promote "The Painting Keanes."

After a Keane painting titled Tomorrow Forever, which featured about 100 children, was selected to be prominently displayed at the 1964 New York World's Fair, The New York Times art critic John Canaday described Keane as a painter celebrated "for grinding out formula pictures of wide-eyed children of such appalling sentimentality that his product has become synonymous among critics with the very definition of tasteless hack work." The Fair's organizers received additional complaints and had the painting withdrawn before it was put on display.

Pop artist Andy Warhol praised Keane's work, telling Life magazine in 1965, "I think what Keane has done is just terrific. It has to be good. If it were bad, so many people wouldn't like it."

=== Career after Walter Keane ===
Margaret Keane left Walter in 1964, divorcing him a year later. In 1970, she announced on a radio broadcast she was the real creator of the paintings that had been attributed to her ex-husband. After Margaret Keane revealed the truth, a "paint-off" between Margaret and Walter was staged in San Francisco's Union Square, arranged by Bill Flang, a reporter from the San Francisco Examiner and attended by the media and Margaret. Walter did not show up. In 1986, she sued both Walter and USA Today in federal court for an article claiming Walter was the real artist. At the trial, the judge ordered both Margaret and Walter to each create a big-eyed painting in the courtroom, to determine who was telling the truth. Walter declined, citing a sore shoulder, whereas Margaret completed her painting in 53 minutes. After a three-week trial, the jury awarded her $4 million in damages. After the verdict, Margaret Keane said "I really feel that justice has triumphed. It's been worth it, even if I don't see any of that four million dollars." A federal appeals court upheld the verdict of defamation in 1990, but overturned the $4 million damages award. Keane said she didn't care about the money, and just wanted to establish the fact that she had done the paintings.

The artworks Margaret Keane created while living in the shadow of her husband tended to depict sad-looking children in dark settings. After she left Walter, she moved to Hawaii and became a Jehovah's Witness, after years of following astrology, palmistry, handwriting analysis, and transcendental meditation, and her work took on a happier, brighter style. "The eyes I draw on my children are an expression of my own deepest feelings. Eyes are windows of the soul," Keane explained. Many galleries now advertise her artworks as having "tears of joy" or "tears of happiness." She described her subjects thus: "These are the paintings of children in paradise. They are what I think the world is going to look like when God's will is done."

Hollywood actors Joan Crawford, Natalie Wood, and Jerry Lewis commissioned Keane to paint their portraits. In the 1990s, Tim Burton, a Keane art collector who would later direct the 2014 biographical film Big Eyes about the life of Margaret Keane, commissioned the artist to paint a portrait of his then-girlfriend Lisa Marie. Keane's art was bought and presented to the United Nations Children's Fund in 1961 by the Prescolite Manufacturing Corporation. Keane's big eyes paintings have influenced toy designs, Little Miss No Name and Susie Sad Eyes dolls, and the cartoon The Powerpuff Girls.

In 2018, Keane received a lifetime achievement award at the LA Art Show.

== Style ==
Keane's paintings are recognizable due to the oversized, doe-like eyes of her subjects. Keane said she was always interested in the eyes and used to draw them in her school books. She began painting her signature "Keane eyes" when she started painting portraits of children. "Children do have big eyes. When I'm doing a portrait, the eyes are the most expressive part of the face. And they just got bigger and bigger and bigger," Keane said. Keane focused on the eyes, as they show the inner person more. Keane attributed Amedeo Modigliani's work as a major influence on the way she painted women from 1959 on. Other artists who influenced her in terms of color, dimension, and composition include Vincent van Gogh, Gustav Klimt, and Pablo Picasso. Despite her claims to fine art, she was never a critical success; instead she remained "known for her sticky-sweet paintings of doe-eyed waifs that became the middlebrow rage in the late 1950s and 1960s, then kitschy collectibles of ironic style decades later."

== Personal life ==
Keane's first husband was Frank Richard Ulbrich, with whom she had a daughter. In 1955, she married Walter Keane. She left Walter in 1964, divorcing him a year later, and then relocating from San Francisco to Hawaii.

In Hawaii, Keane became a devout Jehovah's Witness, which she remained throughout her life. She credited her faith and reading the Bible for giving her the courage to speak the truth about her art.

While still in Hawaii, Keane met Honolulu sports writer Dan McGuire and married him in 1970. She credited McGuire with helping her to become less timid and afraid after her divorce from Walter. Keane lived in Hawaii for more than 25 years before returning to California in 1991. She resided in Napa County, California, with her daughter Jane and son-in-law Don Swigert.

In 2017, at the age of 90, Keane began hospice care while still living in her home. The additional care that she received through hospice allowed her to recover enough "to paint more and relax". She died from heart failure at her home in Napa, California, on June 26, 2022, at the age of 94.

== Media portrayals ==
The 1998 cartoon series The Powerpuff Girls, created by animator Craig McCracken, features leads with abnormally large eyes inspired by Keane's art. The series also features an elementary school teacher named "Ms. Keane".

In 1999, Matthew Sweet's album In Reverse featured one of Keane's oil paintings on its cover.

=== Big Eyes (2014 film) ===
The 2014 biographical film Big Eyes focuses on Margaret Keane and her ex-husband Walter. Margaret was portrayed by Amy Adams, while Walter was played by Christoph Waltz. The film was directed by Tim Burton. The film took 11 years from development to completion.

Margaret Keane turned down various offers for the film rights before meeting with screenwriters Scott Alexander and Larry Karaszewski. Alexander and Karaszewski spent a considerable time gaining her trust after she had had a negative experience with an earlier attempt to develop a project about her. Because the screenwriters wanted to use Keane's actual artwork in the film, they sought her cooperation. In a 2024 Q&A with critic Jan Lisa Huttner at Manhattan's SWAN Day Sweet 16 event, Karaszewski recalled that Keane repeatedly sought assurance that the film would make clear that she, rather than Walter, had created the paintings attributed to him. According to Karaszewski, her only condition for granting the film rights was that it depict her conversion to the Jehovah's Witnesses. Keane made a cameo in the film, sitting on a park bench outside the Palace of Fine Arts. At the 2024 SWAN Day Q&A, production photographer Leah Gallo recalled that Keane also invited members of the crew to her gallery, where she gave them lithographs and signed copies for those who requested them.

Reflecting on the film's reception a decade after its release, Karaszewski told Huttner that many viewers initially “didn't really understand the dilemma that Margaret was going through," pointing out that many male critics didn't understand why Keane stayed with Walter despite his abuse of her. He said that after the emergence of the MeToo movement, audiences understood her experience “really a lot better,” and described Big Eyes retrospectively as an early film of that movement.
