= Scott Alexander and Larry Karaszewski =

American screenwriting team

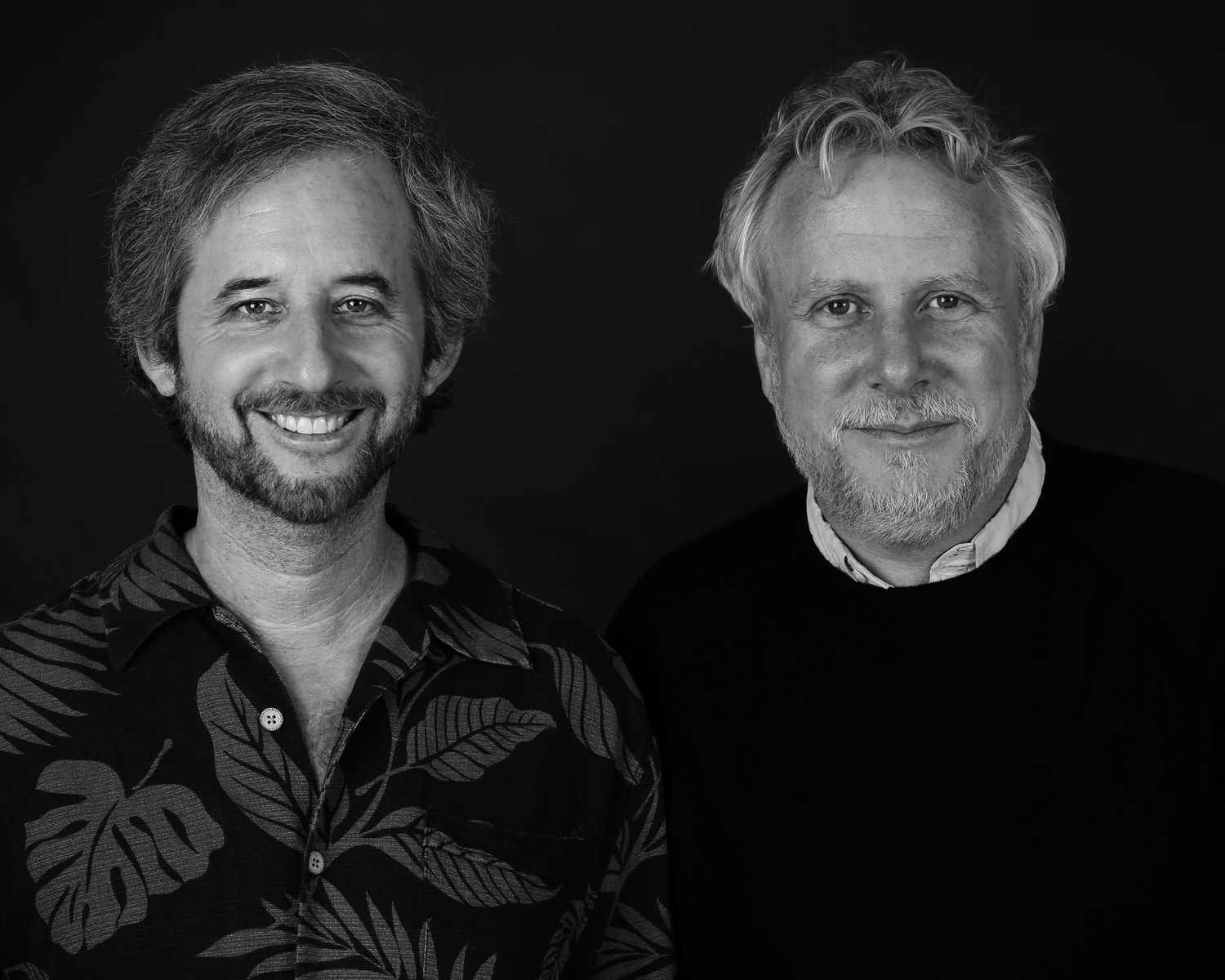
- Alexander (left) and Karaszewski (right) in 2014
- Born: Scott Alexander; June 16, 1963 (age 63); Los Angeles, California, U.S. Larry Karaszewski; November 20, 1961 (age 64); South Bend, Indiana, U.S.
- Education: USC School of Cinematic Arts (both)
- Occupation: Screenwriters
- Years active: 1990–present
- Spouse: Larry: Emily Karaszewski (m. 1991)
- Children: Scott: 3 Larry: 2

Scott Alexander (born June 16, 1963) and Larry Karaszewski (/ˌkærəˈzjuːski/; born November 20, 1961) are an American screenwriting duo, recognized for their unique approach to biopics. They introduced the term "anti-biopic" to describe their distinctive style of storytelling, which focuses on individuals who might not traditionally be considered worthy of a biographical film. Instead of highlighting conventional "great men," their work often centers on lesser-known figures within American pop culture. Their notable films in this genre include Ed Wood, The People vs. Larry Flynt, Man on the Moon, Big Eyes, Dolemite Is My Name, and the series The People v. O. J. Simpson: American Crime Story.

Most of their biographical screenplays are available in book form; Ed Wood was published by Faber and Faber, The People vs. Larry Flynt and Man on the Moon were published by Newmarket Press, and Big Eyes was published by Random House.

== Biography ==
Before they met, Alexander and Karaszewski were both teenage filmmakers. Alexander's Super 8 film work was later featured in a traveling theatrical release spotlighting young directors that also included J. J. Abrams. Karaszewski spent his youth as actor/writer/director on the award-winning student television program Beyond Our Control. They first met as freshman roommates at the University of Southern California, graduating from the School of Cinematic Arts in 1985.

The duo's first success was the popular, but critically derided, comedy Problem Child. They claimed that their original screenplay was a sophisticated black comedy, but that the studio replaced them and watered it down into an unrecognizable state. The film proved to be Universal Pictures' most profitable film of 1990. With the studio in a hurry to make a sequel, they returned to write Problem Child 2.

In 1992, dissatisfied with their careers, Alexander and Karaszewski decided to write a biopic about Edward D. Wood Jr. Rather than mocking him, they identified with the obscure filmmaker and his struggles. Tim Burton loved their script Ed Wood and agreed to direct it. They wrote the screenplay in six weeks. The film won two Academy Awards and was nominated for the Palme d'Or at the Cannes Film Festival. They did uncredited rewrites on Burton's next film Mars Attacks!, inventing the Martian language of "Ack Ack Ack".

Ed Wood's acclaim led to a succession of offbeat biopics. They wrote The People vs. Larry Flynt and Man on the Moon (about the short life of comedian Andy Kaufman), both films directed by Miloš Forman. Alexander and Karaszewski won the Best Screenplay Golden Globe for their work on Larry Flynt. The film also won the top award at the 1997 Berlin International Film Festival.

In 2000, they made their directorial debut with Screwed. The hit Bollywood musical De Dana Dan is an unauthorized remake of Screwed. In 2002, they served as producers on the Paul Schrader film Auto Focus, chronicling the downfall and subsequent murder of Hogan's Heroes star Bob Crane.

The duo wrote and produced Tim Burton's 2014 film Big Eyes, a biopic about painter Margaret Keane. They were initially slated to direct, but later dropped out. The film took them eleven years to get made. Reflecting on the film a decade later at Manhattan's SWAN Day Sweet 16 event in 2024, Karaszewski said that many audiences initially failed to understand Margaret Keane's plight, and described Big Eyes as anticipating later cultural conversations about women and abuse, including the MeToo movement. He credited critic Jan Lisa Huttner as the first film critic who truly understood the film's themes. In an interview with Huttner via Zoom, Karaszewski said:

You were the person who understood this movie better than anybody else at that time period... I mean, the movie was not a big hit of any kind, but when everything went down a few years later [with the MeToo movement], Scott and I were like, ‘Oh my God, we kind of really did write the first movie of that whole movement.’ And I think a lot of people at the time didn't get it and didn't really understand the dilemma that Margaret was going through. A few years later, they got it really a lot better.

In 2016, Alexander and Karaszewski created their first television series, American Crime Story, a true crime anthology drama. The first season is based on the O. J. Simpson trial. The show won nine Primetime Emmys after it aired on FX in 2016, with Alexander and Karaszewski nominated for Outstanding Writing for a Limited Series, Movie, or Dramatic Special. They won the Emmy, Golden Globe, Writers Guild Award, and Producers Guild Award for this miniseries. It was also a ratings juggernaut becoming cable television's most watched new show.

In 2019, they wrote the biopic Dolemite Is My Name, Eddie Murphy's return to the big screen, which has a 97% rating on Rotten Tomatoes. The film was nominated for Best Picture and Best Actor at the 2020 Golden Globes.

=== Other ventures ===
Unproduced screenplays include biopics on Stuart Goldman (for Oliver Stone to direct), the Village People, the Marx Brothers, Howard Hughes (for Miloš Forman to direct), Thomas Stoltz Harvey, Robert Ripley (for Tim Burton to direct), Patty Hearst (for James Mangold to direct), Phil Knight, John McAfee (for Glenn Ficarra and John Requa to direct), the Grateful Dead (for Martin Scorsese to direct), and Bela Lugosi. Additionally, Alexander and Karaszewski were the first writers of a planned 1996 live action film of the cartoon series The Jetsons, which was shut down during pre-production due to the budget. In the late 1990s, the two were employed by Man on the Moon star Jim Carrey to write a star vehicle for him adapted from Henry's List of Wrongs, a novel about a ruthless businessman seeking forgiveness. They also wrote an unproduced draft of Hulk for Jonathan Hensleigh, were hired to write a screenplay based on the Monopoly game for Ridley Scott, and were brought on to pen a stop motion animated version of The Addams Family for Tim Burton. Other early spec scripts include Homewreckers, a crime comedy; and Jupiter Needs Parking, which Alexander called "our version of a Preston Sturges movie."

The duo are active cineastes in Los Angeles hosting screenings of classic films for the American Cinematheque. They are also frequent guests on film related podcasts; among the shows they have appeared on are Maltin on Movies, Gilbert Gottfried's Amazing Colossal Podcast, The Movies That Made Me, The Pure Cinema Podcast, The Dana Gould Hour, The Marx Brothers Council Podcast, The Big Picture, The Treatment, The Film Scene with Illeana Douglas, The Adam Corolla Show, Post Mortem with Mick Garris, The Cannon with Amy Nicholson and The Empire Film Podcast. Karaszewski's numerous film commentaries can be found on the website Trailers from Hell.

In 1999, they both served as advisors to the Sundance Screenwriting Labs. Karaszewski served six years as a Governor for the Writers Branch of the Academy of Motion Picture Arts and Sciences, and was Vice President of History and Preservation for the academy. He served on the juries for the Los Angeles Film Festival in 2010, the Independent Spirit Awards in 2011, and the Indie Memphis Film Festival in 2022. He also co-chaired the Oscar's International Executive Committee from 2018 to 2020 and was instrumental in changing the name of the category from Best Foreign Language Film to Best International Feature. Currently, Karaszewski serves on the board of directors of the National Film Preservation Foundation. In 2023, Alexander was elected to his fourth term on the board of directors for the Writers Guild of America West.

In 2007, they were both featured in the documentary Dreams on Spec, a film looking at the Hollywood creative process from the perspective of the writer. Karaszewski appeared on Turner Classic Movies as a guest host with Ben Mankiewicz for a series called Reframed, spotlighting films considered groundbreaking and controversial.

=== Accolades ===
Several actors have won prestigious awards playing characters in films written by Alexander and Karaszewski. Martin Landau won the Oscar, Golden Globe, SAG, National Board of Review, New York, Los Angeles, and Chicago Film Critics awards for Ed Wood. For The People vs. Larry Flynt, Woody Harrelson was nominated for an Oscar and Golden Globe. Courtney Love was also nominated for a Golden Globe and won the New York Film Critics Circle award. Jim Carrey won the Best Actor Golden Globe for Man on the Moon. Amy Adams won the Best Actress Golden Globe for her portrayal of Margaret Keane in Big Eyes. Almost the entire cast of The People v. O. J. Simpson: American Crime Story won accolades: Sarah Paulson won the Emmy, Golden Globe, SAG, and Critics Choice awards. Both Sterling K. Brown and Courtney B. Vance won Emmys and Critic Choice awards.

The Academy Museum of Motion Pictures in Los Angeles has spotlighted their career with several exhibits including a display of "scene cards" from the third act of The People vs. Larry Flynt and the original Kaypro computer that the team used to write Ed Wood. A quote from Karaszewski serves as a motto for the museum: "The Future of Cinema is in your hands."

The WGA magazine "Written By" featured Alexander and Karaszewski on the cover of the January 2015 issue in a painting by artist Drew Friedman. In 2022, they were inducted into the Final Draft Screenwriter Hall of Fame; others include Quentin Tarantino and Robert Towne. That same year, Film Forum screened a week long retrospective of their biographical films. In 2023, the duo received the Bill Wittliff Award for Screenwriting at the 30th annual Austin Film Festival.

== Filmography ==
Film writers

Year	Title	Director	Notes
1990	Problem Child	Dennis Dugan	
1991	Problem Child 2	Brian Levant	
1994	Ed Wood	Tim Burton	
1996	The People vs. Larry Flynt	Miloš Forman	
1997	That Darn Cat	Bob Spiers	
1999	Man on the Moon	Miloš Forman	
2000	Screwed	Themselves	
2003	Agent Cody Banks	Harald Zwart	
2007	1408	Mikael Håfström	
2014	Big Eyes	Tim Burton	Also producers
2015	Goosebumps	Rob Letterman	Story only
2019	Dolemite Is My Name	Craig Brewer	

Producers

- Auto Focus (2002)

Television

Year	Title	Writers	Executive producers	Note
1993–94	Problem Child	No	Yes	
2016–2018	American Crime Story	Yes	Yes	Also creators

== Awards and nominations ==
Year	Title	Award/Nomination
1994	Ed Wood	Nominated–Saturn Award for Best Writing; Nominated–Writers Guild Award for Best Original Screenplay
1996	The People vs. Larry Flynt	Golden Globe Award for Best Screenplay; Satellite Award for Best Original Screenplay; Writers Guild of America Paul Selvin Award
2014	Big Eyes	Nominated–Independent Spirit Award for Best Screenplay
2016–2018	American Crime Story	Primetime Emmy Award for Outstanding Limited Series (2016, 2018); Golden Globe Award for Best Miniseries or Television Film (2017, 2019); Producers Guild of America Award for Best Long-Form Television (2017); Producers Guild of America Award for Best Limited Series Television (2019); Writers Guild Award for Television: Long Form – Adapted; Nominated–Primetime Emmy Award for Outstanding Writing for a Limited Series, Movie, or Dramatic Special
