= 372 Pages We'll Never Get Back =

Literary criticism podcast

- Logo
- Genre: Literary criticism, comedy, satire
- Language: English

Cast and voices
- Starring: Michael J. Nelson; Conor Lastowka

Music
- Theme music composed by: Conor Lastowka

Production
- Length: typically 90–150 minutes per episode

Technical specifications
- Audio format: MP3

Publication
- No. of seasons: 38
- No. of episodes: 210
- Original release: September 1, 2017

Reception
- Ratings: 4.857142857142857/5, 4.8/5

Related
- Related shows: RiffTrax; Like Trees Walking
- Website: 372pages.com

372 Pages We'll Never Get Back is a podcast series created by Michael J. Nelson (of Mystery Science Theater 3000 and RiffTrax fame) and Conor Lastowka (writer for RiffTrax and novelist). Beginning in 2017 with Ernest Cline's Ready Player One (the titular 372-page book), the podcast discusses literature that the two men "are probably going to hate", though they have stated they end up enjoying some books much more than others.

== Episodes ==
Overview of 372 Pages We'll Never Get Back episodes
| Season | Episodes | Release dates | Book | Summary |
|---|---|---|---|---|
| 1 | 1–8 | September 1 – October 27, 2017 | Ready Player One – Ernest Cline | Bestselling novel, set in a dystopian future where a young man immerses himself in a virtual reality world based on 1980s popular culture and partakes in a competition for fame and fortune. |
| 2 | 9–16 | January 26 – March 23, 2018 | Armada – Ernest Cline | A teenager plays an online video game about defending against an alien invasion, only to find out that the game is a simulator to prepare him against an actual alien invasion. |
| 3 | 19–21 | October 12–26, 2018 | The Eye of Argon – Jim Theis | Sword and sorcery short story about the barbarian Grignr and his adventures. |
| 4 | 22–29 | November 2, 2018 – January 16, 2019 | TekWar – William Shatner and Ron Goulart | A science fiction neo-noir detective novel set in 22nd-century Southern California and Mexico, centered around the fictional electronic drug "tek". |
| 5 | 30–33 | February 4–27, 2019 | The Forensic Certified Public Accountant and the Cremated 64-SQUARES Financial Statements – Dwight David Thrash, CPA FCPA CGMA | Self-published novel about a Certified Public Accountant who attempts to solve the destruction of a skyscraper by the "Cat-Burglar Terrorist" and reconstruct its financial documents. |
| 6 | 34–38 | March 11 – April 11, 2019 | Bob Honey Who Just Do Stuff – Sean Penn | Satirical novel by the Oscar-winning actor, notorious for its "experimental" prose style. |
| 7 | 39–47 | May 6 – July 1, 2019 | The Mister – E. L. James | Romance novel by the author of the bestselling Fifty Shades series about a British aristocrat who falls in love with his Albanian maid. |
| 8 | 48–53 | July 15 – September 3, 2019 | Trucking Through Time – Charles E. Harris | A self-published novel about time traveling truck drivers. |
| 9 | 54–58 | September 16 – October 23, 2019 | The Lair of the White Worm – Bram Stoker | Edwardian-era horror novel by the author of Dracula about a mysterious monster threatening rural Derbyshire. |
| 10 | 59–67 | November 13, 2019 – January 30, 2020 | Shadow Moon – Chris Claremont and George Lucas | Fantasy novel serving as a sequel to the 1988 film Willow. |
| 11 | 68–70 | February 18 – March 10, 2020 | Moon People – Dale M. Courtney | Self-published science fiction romance novel. |
| 12 | 71–77 | April 6 – June 3, 2020 | Digital Fortress – Dan Brown | Mystery/thriller novel on the theme of government surveillance and cryptography, by the author of The Da Vinci Code. |
| 13 | 78–80 | June 30 – July 24, 2020 | My Immortal – Tara Gilesbie | Notorious Harry Potter fan fiction in which the characters are depicted as goths and preps. |
| 14 | 81–88 | August 7 – November 13, 2020 | Midnight Sun – Stephenie Meyer | Retelling of the young adult vampire romance Twilight from the point-of-view of Edward Cullen. |
| 15 | 89–95 | November 26, 2020 – February 26, 2021 | Ready Player Two – Ernest Cline | Sequel to Ready Player One; Wade Watts finds a new advancement in Halliday's vaults that could change the world, and battles an artificial intelligence based on Halliday. |
| 16 | 96–99 | March 23 – April 30, 2021 | The Quilters Push Back: Miranda Hathaway Adventure #7 – Mary Devlin Lynch and Debbie Devlin Zook with Beth Devlin-Keune | Cozy mystery in which a team of quilters confronts the American opioid crisis. |
| 17 | 100–107 | May 20 – September 17, 2021 | Modelland – Tyra Banks and Michael Salort | A young aspiring model attends a magical boarding school for models. |
| 18 | 108–112 | October 8 – November 19, 2021 | Irene Iddesleigh – Amanda McKittrick Ros | Victorian melodrama long ridiculed for its purple prose: a young English lady marries an older man, realizes she does not love him, and then elopes to America with her tutor. |
| 19 | 113–119 | December 10, 2021 – March 23, 2022 | Antigua: The Land of Fairies, Wizards and Heroes (Part 1) – Denise Brown Ellis and Larry Ellis | Self-published children's fantasy novel in which warrior princesses fight an evil dragon. |
| 20 | 120–124 | April 1 – June 17, 2022 | Gump and Co. – Winston Groom | Sequel to the 1986 novel Forrest Gump, published one year after that book's movie adaptation. |
| 21 | 125–130 | July 8 – October 21, 2022 | Super Constitution – Charles Kim | Science-fiction novel about a "troika" of college students who create a single world government by technological means. |
| 22 | 131–134 | November 8 – December 23, 2022 | Murder in Christmas River: A Christmas Cozy Mystery – Meg Muldoon | Christmas-themed cozy mystery about the murder of a man behind a pie shop during a gingerbread house building competition. |
| 23 | 135–139 | January 18 – March 24, 2023 | Edison's Conquest of Mars – Garrett P. Serviss | 19th-century science fiction, considered the first space opera, in which Thomas Edison leads Earth in a war against Martian invaders. |
| 24 | 140–146 | April 11 – June 23, 2023 | Artemis – Andy Weir | Sci-fi heist adventure follow-up to The Martian about a young Saudi Arabian woman living in the titular lunar colony and plotting to get rich. |
| 25 | 147–150 | July 21 – September 7, 2023 | The Starlight Barking – Dodie Smith | Sequel to The Hundred and One Dalmatians, in which dogs acquire supernatural powers and all other creatures are put into a deep sleep. |
| 26 | 151–155 | October 5 – November 29, 2023 | The Adventures of the Teen Archaeologists: The Land of the Moepek – Larry Ellis and Denise Brown Ellis | Young adult fiction about teenaged archaeologists who discover an ancient African civilization. |
| 27 | 156–158 | December 11–26, 2023 | A Killer Christmas Affair: A Cozy Mystery (A Sunflower Farms Cozy Mystery) – Sussie Jordan | Christmas-themed cozy mystery set in the fictional town of Sunflower, Texas. |
| 28 | 159–164 | January 30 – March 20, 2024 | Kaileb's Dream – Kaileb Varney | Self-published young adult novel about a 15-year-old boy whose alter ego is White Bo of the White Blades Council, a foundation protecting the world from evil. |
| 29 | 165–169 | April 17 – June 20, 2024 | Bridge to Bat City – Ernest Cline | Children's novel set in 1980s Austin, Texas, about a girl who helps a colony of Mexican free-tailed bats find a new home under the Congress Avenue Bridge. |
| 30 | 170–174 | July 9 – October 17, 2024 | Tek Kill – William Shatner and Ron Goulart | Eighth novel of the TekWar franchise: Jake Cardigan's boss, Walter Bascomb, is arrested for murder, and Cardigan tries to clear his name. |
| 31 | 175–178 | November 14 – December 26, 2024 | The Quilting Cruise: Miranda Hathaway Adventure #9 – Mary Devlin Lynch and Beth Devlin-Keune | Cozy mystery in which a quilters' guild encounter a mystery aboard a cruise. |
| 32 | 179–182 | January 16 – February 27, 2025 | The Legend of Rah and the Muggles – Nancy Stouffer | Children's science fiction novel about the mutated survivors of a nuclear holocaust, which became notorious when the author claimed in a lawsuit that J. K. Rowling had stolen her ideas in the Harry Potter series. |
| 33 | 183–188 | March 19 – June 5, 2025 | Ugly Love – Colleen Hoover | Romance novel by the author of It Ends with Us. A trainee nurse falls for her brother's mysterious airline pilot friend. |
| 34 | 189–191 | July 16 – August 8, 2025 | Night of the Crabs – Guy N. Smith | Pulp horror novel in which the Welsh town of Llanbedr is invaded by large crabs with a taste for "tender human flesh." |
| 35 | 192–196 | September 11 – November 25, 2025 | Deception Point – Dan Brown | Thriller in which a White House intelligence analyst and an oceanographer investigate a meteorite that supposedly contains proof of extraterrestrial life. |
| 36 | 197–199 | December 4–29, 2025 | Owl Be Home for Christmas – Rosie A. Point | Christmas-themed cozy murder mystery in which a dog-walker and her Dachshund must figure out who murdered a wealthy old woman who owns an owl. |
| 37 | 200–204 | January 16 – March 26, 2026 | The Mayor of Noobtown – Ryan Rimmel | LitRPG adventure: a man dies and is reborn into a world that's built like a video game. |
| 38 | 205–210 | April 13 — July 23, 2026 | Empress Theresa – Norman Boutin | Self-published science fiction novel about a girl who bonds with an alien force and becomes extremely powerful, eventually taking control of the world. The book is notorious for its crudely-drawn cover and the hostile reactions of the author to criticism. |
| 39 | 211– | TBD | Remain: A Supernatural Love Story – Nicholas Sparks with M. Night Shyamalan | Paranormal romance that explores love and loss. |

== Reception ==
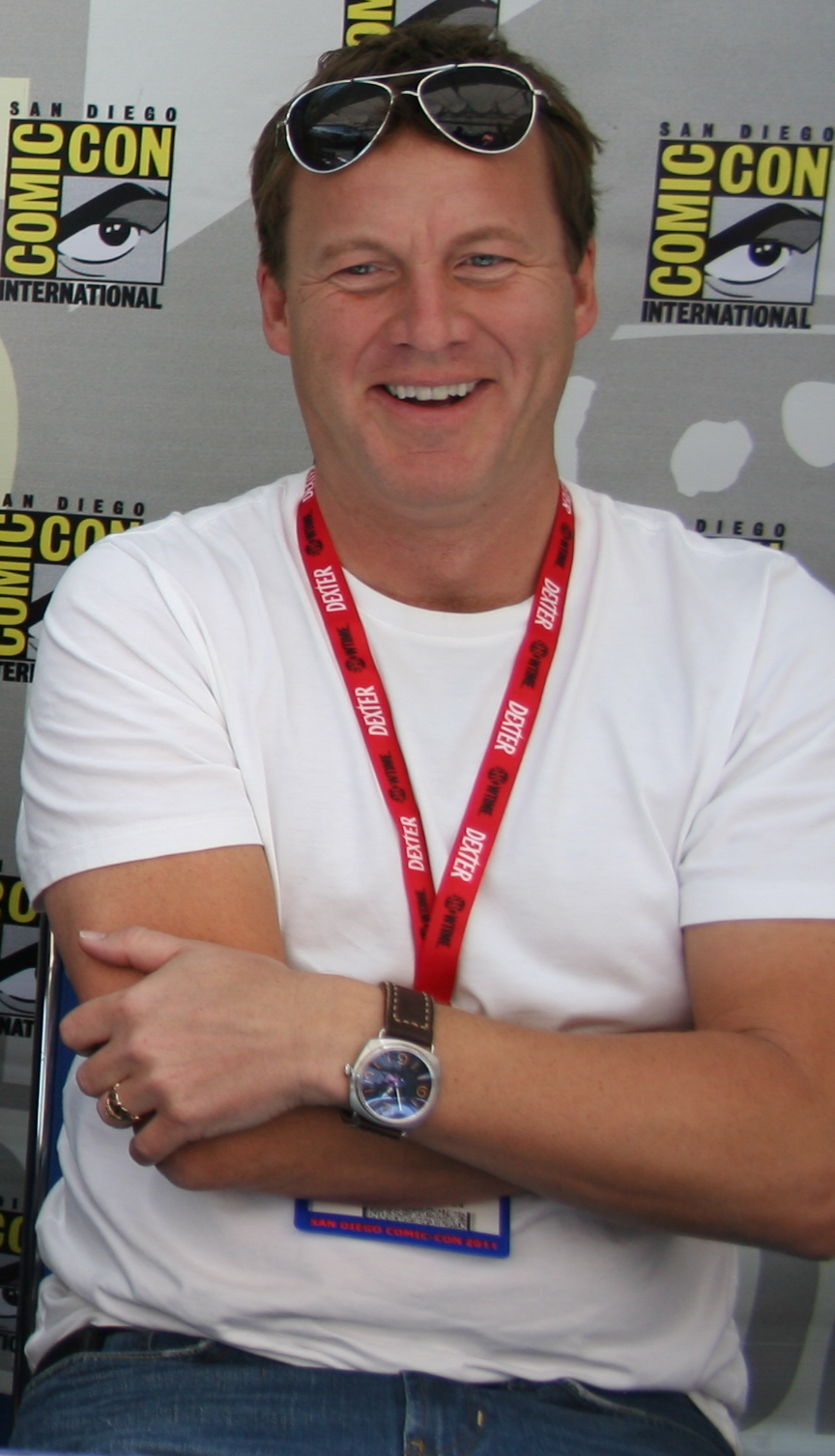
Michael J. Nelson, photographed in 2011.

In 2017, Marc Hershon of Vulture praised the first season of the podcast as a "comedically brutal thrashing" of Ready Player One.

The A.V. Club's Mike Vanderbilt interviewed Nelson and Lastowka in 2018.

In 2019, Alice Nuttall of Book Riot wrote, "Nelson and Lastowka spin bad books into gold. Listening to an episode is like sitting in on a reading group run by people who are much funnier than you are." In 2020, Emily Martin compared 372 Pages to the film podcast How Did This Get Made?.

In 2020, E. A. Henson of Biff Bam Pop! praised the podcast, saying, "372 Pages manages to avoid those common podcast pitfalls and hilarious [sic] transcend the source material...these books are so amazingly bad that they almost seem like some kind of outsider art."
