= Armada (novel) =

2015 science fiction novel by Ernest Cline

Armada: A Novel
- First edition cover
- Author: Ernest Cline
- Language: English
- Subject: Science fiction, video games
- Genre: Science fiction
- Publisher: Crown Publishing Group
- Publication date: July 14, 2015
- Publication place: United States
- Media type: Print (hardcover and paperback), e-book, audiobook
- Pages: 368
- ISBN: 978-0804137256

Armada is a science fiction novel by Ernest Cline, published on July 14, 2015 by Crown Publishing Group (a division of Penguin Random House). The story follows a teenager who plays an online video game about defending against an alien invasion, only to find out that the game is a simulator to prepare him and people around the world for defending against an actual alien invasion.

Wil Wheaton, who narrated the audiobook version of Cline's previous novel, Ready Player One, performs the audiobook of Armada as well. The book received mixed-to-negative reviews but was a New York Times bestseller.

== Plot ==
Zack Lightman, a high school senior with a reputation for getting into trouble, is one of the world’s top players of the video game Armada, an online combat flight simulation game in which the Earth Defense Alliance attempts to save the Earth from extraterrestrial invasion. One day, Zack sees a ship outside his classroom window that resembles a Sobrukai Glaive from Armada, and returns home to look through his late father Xavier's notebooks about a conspiracy theory involving pop culture films (Star Wars, Flight of the Navigator, The Last Starfighter), novels (Ender's Game), and video games about alien invasions and military simulations. Later, at the video game shop where Zack works part-time, his boss Ray surprises him with a fancy new controller for Armada as an early graduation gift. He tries it out on one of the new special missions on Armada that involves attacking the home planet of the aliens using a weapon called the Icebreaker, but the Earth team fails.

The next morning, while Zack is fighting bully Douglas Knotcher at his school, a shuttlecraft with the Earth Defense Alliance (EDA) logo lands. Ray is one of the passengers, and he invites Zack to join him at a top-secret military facility in Nebraska, where he falls in love with a female recruit named Alexis "Lex" Larkin, who plays the similar game Terra Forma and later promises to take him on a date. Zack learns that the EDA is real, that there are actually aliens from Europa (dubbed Sobrukai in the games) planning to invade the planet with ships as shown in the Armada game, and that the EDA had been using Armada to identify and train skilled soldiers to pilot drone ships to protect Earth from the Europans. The EDA reveals that the Europans have planned a three-phase full-scale attack in less than eight hours. During the briefing, the Nebraska base is attacked by a scouting party, during which Zack disobeys orders by chasing down an invading ship into one of the deploying tunnels, where the ship self-destructs and destroys several hundred EDA drones. Although Zack is scolded by Admiral Archibald Vance for the action, he and top performing Armada players Whoadie, Debbie, Chen, and Milo are deployed to Moon Base Alpha, where he will be reporting to his father Xavier, who had faked his death in a factory accident to serve as an EDA general.

In the first wave of attacks, the EDA moon base is attacked by Europan drones. The new recruits attempt to defend it, but ultimately fail and flee to Earth. In the process, Chen and Milo are killed. Zack and Xavier theorize that the entire Europan invasion is only a test to discover how Earth would respond to a civilization-ending threat, given that the aliens could have easily wiped them out at any time, but had let them have opportunities to fight back and win. They determined that a probe that Earth had sent to Europa decades ago by Richard Nixon was actually a nuclear bomb designed to destroy the Europans, meaning that Earth had struck first and had initiated the entire war. They realize that a second Icebreaker had been deployed to destroy Europa around the time of the second wave, which would result in mutually assured destruction. With the second wave starting, Xavier raids an EDA base containing the pilots who are escorting the weapon and sacrifices himself to delay the Icebreaker. While his friends distract the aliens, Zack activates his drones near Europa to defeat the escorts, including his commander, Admiral Vance, and destroy the Icebreaker, resulting in the alien ships powering down and falling to Earth. An icosahedron arises from Europa and identifies itself as the Emissary, a machine that was created by a galactic community of civilizations called the Sodality. The Emissary had orchestrated the entire situation as a test to see if humanity could exist peacefully with their group, and declares that Earth has passed. Zack accepts the membership in the Sodality on behalf of Earth, and the third wave of alien ships arrive to aid the survivors and to restore the planet, giving Sodality technology to Earth. Zack later accepts a job as ambassador to the Sodality, as he is still suspicious of their motives. Zack and Lex go on a date, Zack's family attend Xavier's funeral, Zack gets a baby brother which he names Xavier after his father and Lex and her grandmother help Zack run the video game shop.

== Reception ==
Armada was a New York Times bestseller, debuting at #4 and remaining on the list for five weeks. Despite this, reviews of the book were generally negative. The Washington Post described it as "nostalgic narcissism", The Boston Globe praised it for being "screenplay-ready", but called it "a tedious exercise in nostalgia and sci-fi cliché" and criticized it for engaging in "the worst sort of nerdy wish-fulfillment fantasy", and The Globe and Mail complained that the book had predictable plots and characters and that it failed to do "anything stimulating" with its pop culture references other than reminding readers of them. Io9 said the novel is a "mostly worthwhile read" and "perfectly suited for the cinema" despite the fact that it "doesn't quite live up to expectations", The Verge described it as "a pretty fun ride" but complained about the predictable plot and "the lack of depth you'll find in most characters", and Slate described it as "a book-length love letter of cultural hyperlinks that refer you elsewhere but contain no meaningful content themselves" and said it embodied "everything wrong with gaming culture". Michael J. Nelson's and Conor Lastowka's podcast series 372 Pages We'll Never Get Back analysed and criticized Armada in 2018.

== Contest ==
As he did with the paperback release of his debut novel Ready Player One, Cline held a video game contest to celebrate the release of the paperback of Armada. Readers could play a web browser version of Phaëton (the faux-retro shooter game featured in the book) and the top scorer won an Oculus Rift. All players who scored at least 525 points in the game won an embroidered "Earth Defense Alliance" patch, another reference to the book and a nod to the Activision patch promotions of the 1980s.

== Film adaptation ==
In December 2015, Cline announced the sale of Armada's film rights to Universal Pictures for a reported seven-figure sum. In April 2018, Universal hired Dan Mazeau to write a new draft of the screenplay, in collaboration with Cline and producers Dylan Clark and Dan Farah.

== See also ==
- The Last Starfighter – 1984 science fiction adventure film that inspired this novel. It has the similar premise of playing a video game and being recruited into a real space force.
- Ender's Game – 1985 science fiction novel and 2013 film. Children also are trained to command real space forces through playing a simulation.
- Only You Can Save Mankind – 1992 science fiction novel with partially similar background and ideas. A small boy finds himself in his Alien Invasion video game, where the aliens try to surrender. The events might be real or have a reflection in reality.
