= Irene Iddesleigh =

1897 novel by Amanda McKittrick Ros

- First edition
- Author: Amanda McKittrick Ros
- Language: English
- Genre: romance
- Set in: Kent and New York, 1890s
- Published: 1897
- Publisher: W&G Baird
- Publication place: Ireland
- Media type: Print: octavo
- Pages: 189
- Dewey Decimal: 823.8
- LC Class: HQ734 .M355
- Followed by: Delina Delaney

Irene Iddesleigh^{note} is a romantic drama novel written by Amanda McKittrick Ros. Its publication in 1897 was financed by Ros's husband as a gift on their tenth wedding anniversary. The plot centers around an adopted Canterbury noblewoman named Irene, her marriage to nobleman Sir John Dunfern, and her subsequent affair and elopement with her tutor. It has been widely considered one of the worst books of all time since its publication, and has been panned by critics for its excessive purple prose and poorly constructed plot.

== Plot ==
Noble Sir John Dunfern makes a sudden decision to marry Irene Iddesleigh, an orphan adopted by a nobleman. Despite her being in love with her tutor, Oscar Otwell, she marries Dunfern and has a son, Hugh. While Irene assuages Sir John's early suspicions of her infidelity, he later finds love letters she received from Oscar dated after the marriage. Angered by the revelation of her infidelity, he imprisons Irene in his manor, intending for her to remain there for the rest of her life. About a year later, Oscar and one of her maids help her to escape. Oscar cannot return to his previous job as a schoolteacher, where his boss was acquainted with Dunfern, so he and Irene quietly sell the house they had previously on loan and elope to Dobbs Ferry, New York.

Dunfern is devastated, but finds solace in Hugh, and sends him to the school Oscar previously worked at. He then learns from Oscar's former boss that Irene and Oscar have married. While Dunfern previously felt remorse for his treatment of Irene and intended to include her in his will, he cuts her out entirely upon learning of the marriage.

Meanwhile, Irene and Oscar's marriage is strained. Convinced they could live entirely off the money he got for selling their Canterbury house for the rest of their lives, Oscar does not see fit to get a new teaching job until he and Irene are on the brink of total ruin, and descends into alcoholism. When he is fired from his new job, he comes home and beats Irene, who then leaves him and becomes a duenna. Oscar comes to regret abusing Irene, but cannot find her. He then drowns himself, leaving a note for Irene apologizing and begging her to return to Sir John in Canterbury.

As Irene returns to England, Sir John lies on his deathbed. He sends for Hugh so that he can tell him about Irene's wrongdoings. However, when Hugh arrives, Dunfern has lost his speech capabilities. Mysteriously, he then regains them; after telling Hugh the truth about his mother, he reveals just before dying that he had originally planned to release Irene on the day she escaped.

Irene arrives shortly after Sir John's death, and expresses grief and remorse while visiting his grave. When Hugh realizes that the mourner at his father's grave is Irene, he condemns her and orders her to leave for good. Having no money and no place to live, she commits suicide.

== Critical reception ==
Irene Iddesleigh received extremely poor reviews from critics. Mark Twain called it "one of the greatest unintentionally humorous novels of all time", while the Inklings turned the novel into a competition to see who could read it aloud for the longest time without laughing. In Epic Fail, Mark O'Connell wrote "Ros' [sic] prose amounts to a sort of accidental surrealism. There is an intention toward metaphor—a lunge in the general direction of the literary—but an obvious misunderstanding of how such things work (and often, for that matter, how syntax works)." O'Connell emphasized that "Ros' [sic] writing is not just bad, in other words; its badness is so potent that it seems to undermine the very idea of literature, to expose the whole endeavor of making art out of language as essentially and irredeemably fraudulent—and, even worse, silly." Robert H. Taylor stated that the novel "is so bad that it is very endearing. [Ros] didn't know anything about grammar or syntax, and she didn't care a rap about the meaning of words, but she loved jeweled prose."

"The book", wrote Barry Pain, in 1898, "has not amused. It began by doing that. Then, as its enormities went on getting more and more enormous in every line, the book seemed something titanic, gigantic, awe-inspiring. The world was full of Irene Iddesleigh, by Mrs. Amanda McKittrick Ros, and I shrank before it in tears and in terror." Ros responded to this review with a foreword in her next novel, Delina Delaney (1898), titled "Criticism of Barry Pain on Irene Iddesleigh". There she attacks "this so-called Barry Pain" for "criticis[ing] a work the depth of which fails to reach the solving power of his borrowed, and, he'd have you believe, varied talent." Going, on, she says she cares nothing "for the opinion of half-starved upstarts, who don the garb of a shabby-genteel, and fain would feed the mind of the people with the worthless scraps of stolen fancies."

Don Howard of the Salt Lake Telegram said of the book in 1927: "Just to say what the story is all about is, to say the least, extremely vague, as far as any excuse for its telling can be ascertained." He describes Ros's writing style as "hav[ing] the merit of concealing thought and plot...the mind rocks along through its pages in delirium", concluding that it is "rather a unique literary curiosity, which is its only value to the reader."

The satirical literary criticism podcast 372 Pages We'll Never Get Back reviewed Irene Iddesleigh in 2021.

== Notes ==
1. The pronunciation /aɪˈriːniː ˈɪdzliː/ eye-REE-nee IDZ-lee is most likely intended; "eye-ree-nee" was the common Victorian English pronunciation and would fit the pattern of alliterative names used by Ros: Delina Delaney, Helen Huddleson; while "idzly" is the pronunciation used by the Earls of Iddesleigh.
