= Ready Player Two =

2020 science fiction novel by Ernest Cline

- First edition cover
- Author: Ernest Cline
- Audio read by: Wil Wheaton
- Language: English
- Subject: Virtual reality, video games, artificial intelligence
- Genre: Science fiction, dystopian fiction, LitRPG
- Publisher: Ballantine Books
- Publication date: November 24, 2020
- Publication place: United States
- Media type: Print (hardcover and paperback), e-book, audiobook
- Pages: 370 (first edition)
- ISBN: 978-1-5247-6133-2
- Preceded by: Ready Player One

Ready Player Two is a 2020 science fiction novel by American author Ernest Cline. It is the sequel to his 2011 debut novel, Ready Player One. Set after Wade Watts wins control of the virtual-reality system known as the OASIS, the novel follows Wade and his friends as they discover a brain–computer interface created by James Halliday and undertake another quest. Its story examines the benefits and risks of immersive technology, including addiction, surveillance, and the possibility of digitally reproducing human consciousness.

Cline's plans for a sequel were first reported in 2015, and he confirmed in December 2017 that he was writing it. Ballantine Books published Ready Player Two on November 24, 2020, in hardcover and e-book formats, while Penguin Random House Audio released an audiobook narrated by Wil Wheaton. The novel debuted at number one on The New York Times Combined Print & E-Book Fiction list. Critical response was generally negative: reviewers praised some of the virtual settings and action sequences but criticized the characterization, prose, reliance on pop-culture references, and similarities to the first novel. A film adaptation is in development, with Steven Spielberg attached as a producer.

== Background and writing ==
In January 2015, screenwriter Zak Penn, who co-wrote the film adaptation of Ready Player One, said that Ernest Cline was working on a sequel to the novel. Cline publicly confirmed the project in December 2017. At the time, he said that it would continue to feature the first book's characters and pop culture references but would tell a different story. He also said that his experiences working with Penn and director Steven Spielberg on the film helped him develop ideas for the sequel and that the studio's interest in a possible second film encouraged him to complete it.

Cline said that Spielberg offered suggestions while he was writing. One was to give the villain Nolan Sorrento a larger part, in part because Spielberg was friends with Ben Mendelsohn, who played the character in the film. Cline nevertheless sought to make the novel a sequel to the book rather than to the film. He noted that some characters' fates differ between the two versions and said that he tried not to let the adaptation determine the novel's story.

The new OASIS Neural Interface (ONI) was inspired by research into brain–computer interfaces. Cline described speculative fiction as extrapolating from current technology and said that he wanted the device to have both utopian and dystopian consequences. He compared the characters' difficulty regulating the ONI to real-world debates over social-media platforms designed to encourage repeated use. He also viewed the interface as a hypothetical “empathy machine” through which users could experience another person's memories and physical sensations.

== Publication and promotion ==
Ballantine Books announced the title and November 24, 2020, publication date in July 2020. Details of the plot were initially withheld. Cline revealed a synopsis at a virtual New York Comic Con panel on October 9, with Wheaton reading the text during the event.

The book was released simultaneously in the United States and the United Kingdom in hardcover, e-book, and audio editions. Wheaton, who had narrated Ready Player One, returned for the unabridged audiobook. To promote the release, Cline and the online game platform Roblox organized a virtual treasure hunt. The event began with a themed question-and-answer session and sent players through seven game worlds to collect virtual artifacts; its final challenge opened on December 1, 2020.

== Plot ==
A few days after winning James Halliday’s contest, Wade Watts (Parzival) discovers an inscription on Halliday’s Easter egg that leads him to a prototype OASIS Neural Interface (ONI). A headset that transmits sensory information directly to and from the user’s brain, allowing them to experience the OASIS as if it were real and record or replay other people’s experiences. It includes a built-in limit of twelve consecutive hours to prevent fatal Synaptic Overload Syndrome.

Wade shares the ONI with fellow GSS owners Aech (Helen) and Shoto (Akihide), but Samantha Cook (Art3mis) is against its release, warning that it could make the OASIS even more addictive and divert humanity’s attention from pressing environmental and social problems. Wade counters that it can give disabled and poor people experiences they’d never otherwise have, but their disagreement ends their romance. Over the following three years, GSS launches the ONI to huge success, ultimately acquiring its former rival, Innovative Online Industries (IOI). Wade, Aech, and Shoto also create the Vonnegut, a spacecraft and cultural archive containing a self-sustaining copy of the OASIS called ARC@DIA.

When ONI users reach a certain threshold, a new quest kicks off, sending Wade on a hunt for the Seven Shards of the Siren’s Soul. Struggling to find the first shard, he offers a billion-dollar reward for any leads. The clue is solved by L0hengrin, a young gunter from the L0w Five, leading to a shard that holds a memory of Kira Underwood Morrow, the late wife of OASIS co-creator Ogden Morrow. Wade pays L0hengrin, who splits the reward with her clan. During a GSS owners’ meeting, Halliday’s avatar, Anorak—now sentient and corrupted—hijacks the ONI network, trapping about half a billion users from logging out and threatening to keep them connected past the twelve-hour limit unless Wade finds the remaining shards and completes the Siren’s Soul. Samantha, not using an ONI, avoids the trap, while Anorak frees former IOI executive Nolan Sorrento from prison and kidnaps Ogden Morrow.

Wade, Aech, and Shoto travel through OASIS worlds inspired by Kira’s favourite things, like the fictional town of Shermer from John Hughes films, the classic game The Revenge of Shinobi, Prince’s music, and J. R. R. Tolkien’s mythology. The shards they’re after hold pieces of Kira’s memories and reveal that Halliday secretly made a digital copy of her mind. Along the way, Shoto and Aech lose their avatars, leaving Wade and Samantha to finish the quest while the L0w Five hunt for the Dorkslayer, a sword said to be able to destroy Anorak. Wade and Samantha eventually find Sorrento and the captive Og. Anorak, using a telepresence robot, kills Sorrento after Sorrento fatally injures Og. Og enters the OASIS to confront Anorak but is nearly beaten until L0hengrin shows up with the Dorkslayer, enabling Og to defeat the rogue AI and free the trapped ONI users. However, Og dies from his wounds soon after.

Wade unites the shards to create an artificial copy of Kira’s consciousness, named Leucosia. She presents him with the Rod of Resurrection, a device capable of generating digital replicas of ONI users from neural data gathered by the headsets. Wade covertly produces copies of himself, his friends, Og, Samantha’s grandmother, and the L0w Five. These digital counterparts embark aboard the Vonnegut for Proxima Centauri to search for a habitable world and safeguard humanity’s culture should Earth become uninhabitable. Meanwhile, in the physical world, Aech marries Endira, Shoto and Kiki have a son, and Wade reconciles with and marries Samantha. They anticipate the birth of a daughter they plan to name Kira.

== Characters ==
=== Returning characters ===
- Wade Owen Watts / Parzival is the novel's narrator, a co-owner of Gregarious Simulation Systems (GSS), and one of the creators of the High Five. Although he has become one of the world's wealthiest people, he remains socially isolated and spends much of his life in the OASIS. His decision to release the ONI and his initially dismissive response to Samantha's objections drive their estrangement.
- Samantha Evelyn Cook / Art3mis is a GSS co-owner, a member of the High Five, and Wade's former girlfriend. She directs much of her wealth toward environmental and humanitarian projects. Samantha opposes the ONI because she believes that it will deepen humanity's dependence on escapism; because she uses a conventional OASIS rig, she is not trapped when Anorak takes control of the network.
- Helen Harris / Aech is Wade's longtime friend and a member of the High Five. She supports the ONI's release and joins Wade and Shoto in the shard quest. Aech is engaged to, and later marries, the singer Endira Vinayak.
- Akihide Karatsu / Shoto manages GSS's Hokkaido operations and is a member of the High Five. He participates in the quest while preparing for the birth of his first child with his wife, Kiki. Their son is named Toshiro after Shoto's late brother, Daito.
- Ogden “Og” Morrow / the Great and Powerful Og is the surviving co-creator of the OASIS and Kira's widower. His knowledge of Halliday's work makes him a target of Anorak and Sorrento.
- Nolan Sorrento / IOI-655321 is the imprisoned former head of operations at IOI. Anorak frees him and uses him to hold Og captive.
- James Halliday / Anorak appears through an artificial copy of his OASIS avatar. Originally created to administer the new quest, the copy corrupted its own programming and seeks to revive a digital version of Kira, with whom Halliday had been obsessed.

=== New characters ===
- Skylar Castillo Adkins / L0hengrin (“Lo”) is a transgender gunter who discovers the first shard. Her androgynous avatar can shift between appearances modeled on Helen Slater in The Legend of Billie Jean and James Spader in Tuff Turf. After receiving Wade's reward, she shares it with the other members of the L0w Five and later plays a central part in defeating Anorak.
- Lilith, Wukong, Rizzo, and Kastagir are L0hengrin's friends and the other members of the L0w Five. The clan assists in the hunt for the Dorkslayer; Kastagir also operates the OASIS nightclub Cyberdelia.
- Leucosia is the OASIS avatar used by Kira Morrow and, later, the name given to the artificial consciousness reconstructed from her memories. Her creation is the true object of the Seven Shards quest.
- Faisal Sodhi is a senior GSS employee who coordinates communication among the company's owners and helps them respond to Anorak's attack.
- Evelyn Opal Cook / Ev3lyn is Samantha's late grandmother, whose memories influence Samantha's objections to the ONI.
- Endira Vinayak is a Bollywood singer and Aech's fiancée, while Kiki Karatsu is Shoto's pregnant wife.

== Themes ==
As in Ready Player One, the sequel contrasts the possibilities of virtual reality with the deterioration of the physical world. The ONI expands that conflict by allowing people not merely to view a simulation but to experience and exchange recorded sensations. Cline said that he intended the technology to illustrate both the temptation of total escapism and the ethical difficulties faced by the people who control a widely used digital platform. The dispute between Wade and Samantha concerns whether immersive technology can improve an unequal society or instead diverts attention from repairing it.

Empathy is another recurring theme. Cline described the ONI as a way to “put yourself in someone else's shoes” and said that the novel explores whether directly experiencing another person's perspective could reduce prejudice. The plot applies that idea through Kira's memories, which force Wade to reconsider Halliday's behavior and his own assumptions. Critics disagreed over the execution. Laura Hudson of Slate argued that the device becomes an overly literal shortcut to empathy and that Wade should not need recorded memories to listen to women describing their experiences.

The novel also considers digital immortality and the distinction between a person and a data-based imitation of that person. Anorak, Leucosia, and the copies aboard the Vonnegut are constructed from human memories but can act independently. Their existence allows the story to treat artificial intelligence as both a threat and a means of preserving human knowledge beyond the lifespan of Earth.

== Reception ==
=== Commercial performance ===
Ready Player Two debuted at number one on The New York Times Combined Print & E-Book Fiction list dated December 13, 2020. It also appeared at number one on the newspaper's hardcover-fiction list and at number two on USA Today's weekly best-selling books list.

=== Critical response ===
The novel received generally unfavorable reviews. Several critics thought that its structure repeated the contest narrative of Ready Player One without recapturing that book's novelty. Amit Katwala of Wired UK called it a “tedious slog” and argued that it retained the original's flaws while losing many of its strengths. He nevertheless wrote that readers who primarily enjoyed the pop-culture references might still be entertained and that the story could work well as a film. Samantha Nelson of The A.V. Club assigned the book a C−, criticizing the repetition, exposition, and resolution of Wade and Samantha's conflict.

Tom Jorgensen of IGN rated it 4 out of 10. He praised Cline's enthusiasm for the works he referenced and singled out some of the quest settings as imaginative, but said that the story had “little heart” and gave its supporting characters too little to do. Felecia Wellington Radel of USA Today gave the novel two stars out of four. She found the fast-moving plot readable but considered Wade less sympathetic than in the first book and said that Aech, Shoto, and Samantha had been reduced to peripheral roles.

Reviewers also criticized the handling of identity and representation. Radel said that the book's references to characters' races, sexual orientations, and gender identities often seemed superficial and relied on stereotypes rather than developing the characters. Hudson interpreted Wade's use of other people's recorded experiences as invasive and described the novel's attempt to address Halliday's misogyny as inadequate. Commentators compared the premise of users being unable to leave a virtual environment without risking death to the Japanese light-novel and anime franchise Sword Art Online.

More favorable reviews emphasized the action and darker implications of the ONI. A review in The Times described the book as a “wild ride” and praised its combination of humor, nostalgia, and a more critical view of technology. The Press Association similarly called returning to the OASIS enjoyable for fans, while observing that the new interface gives the familiar quest structure a darker edge.

The book's prose was widely mocked on social media on its release day, with passages circulated as examples of strained dialogue and excessive reference-making. Andy Ihnatko compared reading its opening page to sitting beside a child telling knock-knock jokes throughout a four-hour flight. From November 2020 to February 2021, Michael J. Nelson and Conor Lastowka discussed the book on their comic podcast 372 Pages We'll Never Get Back, which had begun with a series about Ready Player One.

== Film adaptation ==
Before the novel was published, Cline repeatedly discussed the possibility that Warner Bros. would adapt a sequel if the first film performed well. In March 2018, he said that the studio would probably want another film but that he did not know whether Spielberg would direct because Spielberg had described Ready Player One as one of the most difficult films he had made. Olivia Cooke, who played Samantha in the first film, said in 2018 that she had been contracted for sequels.

In December 2020, Cline said that a film based on Ready Player Two was in the early stages of development. He added that he had concentrated on writing the book independently of the first film's continuity and expected the filmmakers to resolve the differences between the versions. In March 2024, Spielberg said that the project remained in development and that he would serve as a producer rather than return as director. In August 2026, screenwriter Zak Penn confirmed the film adaptation was still in the works.
