= Ready Player One (film) =

2018 film by Steven Spielberg

- Theatrical release poster
- Directed by: Steven Spielberg
- Screenplay by: Zak Penn; Ernest Cline
- Based on: Ready Player One by Ernest Cline
- Produced by: Donald De Line; Kristie Macosko Krieger; Steven Spielberg; Dan Farah
- Starring: Tye Sheridan; Olivia Cooke; Ben Mendelsohn; T.J. Miller; Simon Pegg; Mark Rylance
- Cinematography: Janusz Kamiński
- Edited by: Michael Kahn; Sarah Broshar
- Music by: Alan Silvestri
- Production companies: Warner Bros. Pictures; Amblin Entertainment; Village Roadshow Pictures; RatPac-Dune Entertainment; De Line Pictures
- Distributed by: Warner Bros. Pictures
- Release dates: March 11, 2018 (SXSW); March 29, 2018 (United States)
- Running time: 140 minutes
- Country: United States
- Language: English
- Budget: $155–175 million
- Box office: $608 million

Ready Player One is a 2018 American science fiction action film directed by Steven Spielberg and written by Zak Penn and Ernest Cline. Based on Cline's 2011 novel, the film stars Tye Sheridan, Olivia Cooke, Ben Mendelsohn, Lena Waithe, T.J. Miller, Simon Pegg, and Mark Rylance. The film is set in 2045, where much of humanity uses the OASIS, a virtual reality simulation, to escape the real world. Teenage orphan Wade Watts (Sheridan) finds clues to a contest that promises ownership of the OASIS to the winner, and he and his friends try to complete it before an evil corporation can do so.

Development of the film began in mid-2010 when Warner Bros. Entertainment acquired the rights to the book. In July 2015, Spielberg signed on to direct and produce the film, with casting commencing in September 2015. Filming began in England in June 2016 and was completed in September that year. The visual effects were handled by Industrial Light & Magic, Digital Domain, and Territory Studio, with some pre-visualization work done by the Third Floor, Inc.. As with the novel, many popular culture references appear throughout the film, including those to the Back to the Future franchise, The Iron Giant and The Shining.

Ready Player One premiered at South by Southwest in Austin, Texas on March 11, 2018, and was theatrically released in the United States on March 29, by Warner Bros. Pictures. It received positive reviews from critics, who praised Spielberg's direction, the visual effects, brisk pacing, and the performances of Sheridan and Rylance. The film was a commercial success, grossing $608 million worldwide against a $155–175 million budget, and earned a nomination for Best Visual Effects at the 91st Academy Awards, 24th Critics' Choice Awards, and 72nd British Academy Film Awards. Ready Player One was awarded the title of Best Science Fiction Film at the 45th Saturn Awards, and a further two Outstanding Achievement Awards from the Visual Effects Society. A sequel is in development.

== Plot ==
In a dystopian 2045, people seek to escape from reality through the OASIS (Ontologically Anthropocentric Sensory Immersive Simulation), a virtual reality entertainment universe created by James Halliday and Ogden Morrow of Gregarious Games. After Halliday's death, a pre-recorded message left by his avatar Anorak announces a contest, granting ownership of the OASIS to the first to find the golden Easter egg within it, which is locked behind a gate requiring three keys players can obtain by accomplishing three challenges. The contest has lured several egg hunters, or "Gunters", and the interest of Nolan Sorrento, the CEO of Innovative Online Industries (IOI) who seeks to control the OASIS and insert intrusive online advertising. IOI uses an army of indentured servants and employees called "Sixers" to find the egg.

Wade Watts, an avid orphaned Columbus, Ohio-based Gunter using the avatar Parzival, participates in the first challenge, an unbeatable race, along with his best friend Aech, and Art3mis, a female avatar whom Parzival has a crush on. Parzival regularly visits Halliday's Journals, a simulated archive of Halliday's life and hobbies, run by the Curator. Wade receives the Copper Key from Anorak after he wins by driving backward, while Art3mis, Aech, and his friends Daito and Sho, all win the race afterward, later being collectively named the High-5 on the OASIS' scoreboard.

Sorrento hires the mercenary i-R0k to learn Wade's true identity, intent on bribing him to win the contest on IOI's behalf. Wade and Art3mis discover from the Journals that Halliday once dated Morrow's wife Karen "Kira" Underwood. Wade and Art3mis visit the Distracted Globe night club to look for clues, where Wade confesses his love and true name to Art3mis. They survive an IOI raid in which Art3mis abandons Wade, explaining that her father died in debt to IOI. i-R0k, who was eavesdropping on their conversation, informs Sorrento of his findings. Sorrento contacts Wade with his offer. When rejected, Sorrento attempts to kill Wade by bombing his house, killing Wade's aunt Alice among others.

Art3mis' player Samantha Cook takes Wade in. Together, they realize the second challenge relates to Halliday's regret of not pursuing a relationship with Kira. Along with Aech, Daito, and Sho, Parzival and Art3mis search for the Overlook Hotel's recreation. Art3mis asks Kira to dance and wins the Jade Key. Sorrento's subordinate F'Nale Zandor storms the Gunters' hideout, taking Samantha to an IOI Loyalty Center to pay off her father's debt. Wade escapes with the help of the other High-5 users, Helen Harris (Aech), Toshiro (Daito), and Zhou (Sho) in Helen's truck. Samantha escapes confinement after Wade and others hack Sorrento's OASIS rig.

The third challenge is found in Castle Anorak on Planet Doom, where players must guess Halliday's favorite Atari 2600 game to earn the Crystal Key. iR0k places a forcefield around the castle using the Orb of Osuvox, but Art3mis eventually disables it. The High-5 lead an army of OASIS players against the Sixers. Sorrento fights back but Aech, Daito, and Art3mis destroy his avatar. Parzival destroys Samantha's avatar, allowing her to flee IOI while the High-5 pick her up, and reaches the console, but Sorrento uses the Cataclyst bomb to wipe out every avatar on Planet Doom including himself.

Parzival survives using an extra life coin given to him earlier by the Curator in a bet. He plays the 1980 game Adventure and wins the Crystal Key by locating Warren Robinett's Easter egg. He uses the three keys to enter a treasure room where Anorak offers him a contract. Parzival recognizes it as the one Morrow signed when Halliday forced him out of Gregarious Games and refuses to sign it. Anorak transforms into Halliday, who expresses his regrets in life and hands over the Easter egg, thanking Wade for playing his game. Sorrento and F'Nale are arrested in the aftermath of the bombing.

Ogden Morrow appears, revealing he is the Curator. Wade decides to run the OASIS with the High-5, inviting Morrow to join them as a consultant. As the IOI Loyalty Centers shut down, the High-5 make the controversial choice to close the OASIS every Tuesday and Thursday, so people can spend more time in the real world.

== Cast ==
- Tye Sheridan as Wade Watts / Parzival, a Gunter who wishes to win the egg hunt so he can move out of his impoverished neighborhood of stacked trailers called "the Stacks". His avatar's name is derived from Percival of Arthurian Legend.
- Olivia Cooke as Samantha Cook / Art3mis, a well-known Gunter who works with various allies to ensure the OASIS is kept free and out of the hands of IOI, both inside the game and in real life. Art3mis is Samantha's pink-skinned, pink-haired avatar, named for Artemis of Greek mythology.
- Ben Mendelsohn as Nolan Sorrento / IOI-655321, the CEO of Innovative Online Industries who seeks full control over the OASIS. His avatar of IOI-655321 is a heavily-muscled businessman.
- Lena Waithe as Helen Harris / Aech, a Gunter and long-time friend of Wade's who works as a mechanic in the OASIS. Her avatar of Aech is a male cyborg of indeterminate species.
- T.J. Miller as the voice and motion-capture of i-R0k, a freelance dealer and mercenary often employed by IOI. He shares his name with a character from the novel, but is otherwise unrelated. Unlike the other characters, his true appearance outside of the OASIS is not shown.
- Simon Pegg as Ogden "Og" Morrow / The Curator, a co-creator of the OASIS who eventually left the company and is concerned that many people have developed an unhealthy dependency on the game. His avatar in this film is the Curator who works at the Halliday Journal archives.
- Mark Rylance as James Halliday / Anorak the All-Knowing, the deceased co-creator of the OASIS who reveals after his death that an Easter Egg is hidden in the OASIS that grants control over the OASIS to its winner. His avatar of Anorak the All-Knowing is an old, tall wizard.
- Philip Zhao as Zhou / Sho, a young Chinese Gunter and one of the "High Five". He is based upon Akihide "Shoto" Karatsu, a Japanese Gunter featured in the novel. Zhou's avatar of Sho is a ninja.
- Win Morisaki as Toshiro Yoshiaki / Daito, a Japanese Gunter and one of the "High Five". His avatar of Daito is an armored samurai. Unlike the book, Toshiro is not killed by IOI and survives to the end.
- Hannah John-Kamen as F'Nale Zandor, IOI's head of operations in the physical world and for their indentured servant programs at IOI's Loyalty Centers.
- Susan Lynch as Alice, Wade's aunt who Wade has a poor relationship with
- Ralph Ineson as Rick, the boyfriend of Alice who mistreats Wade
- Perdita Weeks as Karen "Kira" Underwood, Morrow's wife who Halliday also loved
- Turlough Convery as IOI's chief oology expert who leads the other IOI oology experts at finding the right video game to grant the Sixers access to the Easter egg

Other appearances in the film include Letitia Wright as Reb, a rebel at Samantha's safe house, Lulu Wilson and Mckenna Grace as students using the OASIS when Halliday's pre-recorded will is shown, and Jane Douglas of the YouTube group OutsideXbox in a cameo appearance as a Sixer.

Additionally, among the many gaming characters that appear in the film, two of them have credited speaking roles; Cara Theobold reprises her role as Tracer from Overwatch; Vic Chao reprises his role as Mortal Kombat antagonist Goro from Mortal Kombat X.

== Production ==
=== Development and casting ===
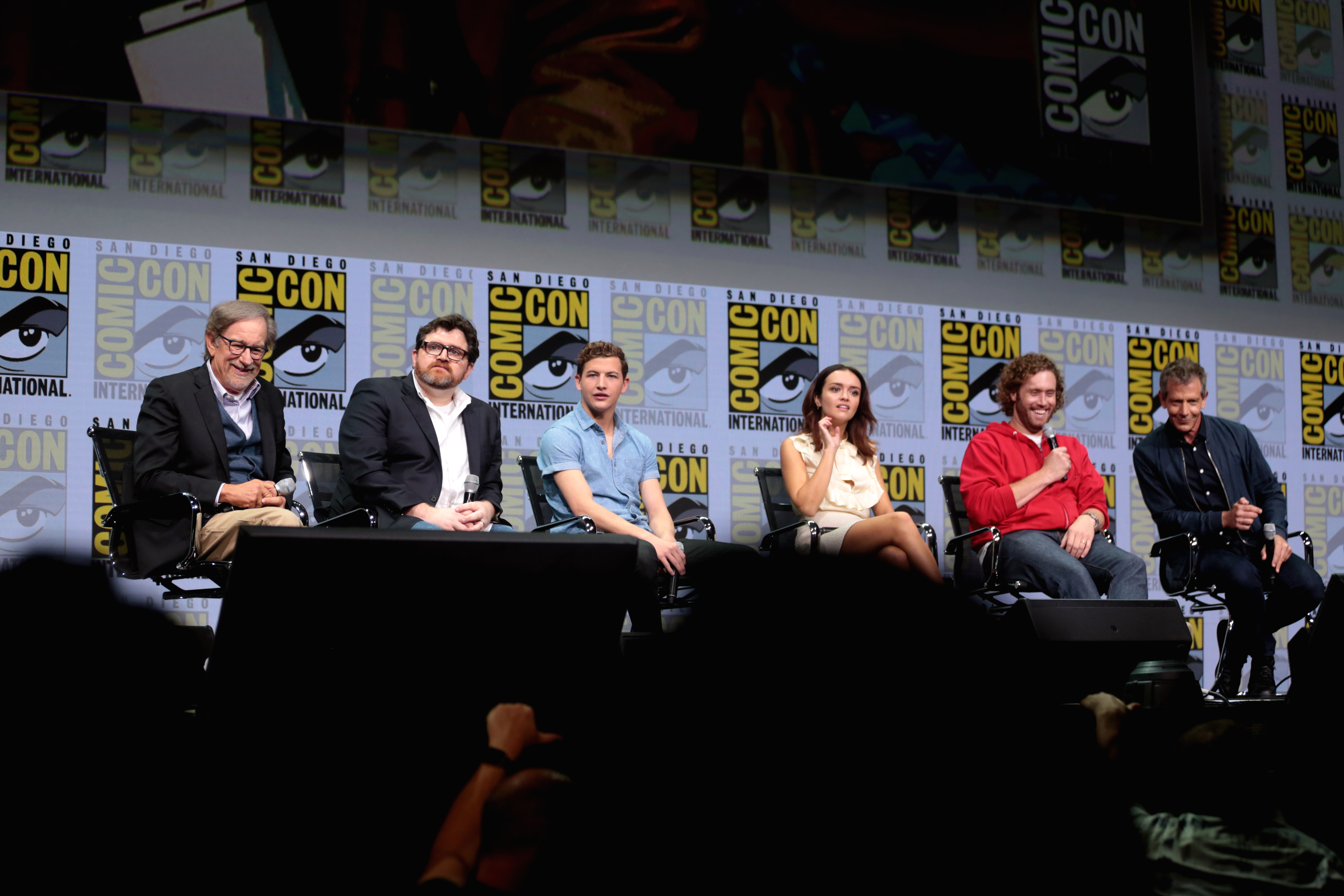
Director Steven Spielberg (far left) and Ernest Cline with the cast of Ready Player One at San Diego Comic-Con. From third of left: Tye Sheridan, Olivia Cooke, T.J. Miller, and Ben Mendelsohn.

Warner Bros. bought the film rights for producers Dan Farah and Donald De Line in June 2010, one year before the book was published. Ernest Cline was set to write the script for the film, which De Line and Farah would produce. Eric Eason rewrote Cline's script, and Zak Penn was hired to rewrite the previous drafts by Cline and Eason (who became uncredited for the final draft), along with Village Roadshow Pictures coming aboard. Warner Bros. attempted to convince Christopher Nolan to direct the film as his next project after Interstellar (2014), but he declined. Afterwards the studio made a shortlist of potential directors including Robert Zemeckis, Edgar Wright, Matthew Vaughn, and Peter Jackson. A directorial offer was also sent to Josh Trank, who turned it down twice. Steven Spielberg finally signed on to direct and produce the film, which Kristie Macosko Krieger also produced, along with De Line and Farah. Cline and Penn made several revisions while adapting the novel to film. Most of these changes were to eliminate scenes that would be uninteresting in a visual format, such as when Wade beats a high score in Pac-Man, or recites all the lines from the film WarGames (1983). In 2016, American musician Moby said he had tried to make the book into a movie, but discovered that Spielberg had taken the role before him.

Elle Fanning, Olivia Cooke and Lola Kirke were the frontrunners for the role of Art3mis; with Cooke announced as having been cast in the role by September 2015. In January 2016, Ben Mendelsohn joined the cast. In February 2016, Tye Sheridan was confirmed to play Wade, after a lengthy casting search for the role. Barry Keoghan screen-tested for the part. Simon Pegg was added to the cast in March, with Mark Rylance joining in April. By June, T.J. Miller, Hannah John-Kamen, and Win Morisaki had also been cast in the film. In July, Philip Zhao joined the cast, with Lena Waithe, Ralph Ineson, Mckenna Grace, and Letitia Wright being revealed as appearing in the film over time prior to the film's release.

In October 2019, Doctor Sleep (2019) director Mike Flanagan revealed that Jack Nicholson, who portrayed Jack Torrance in The Shining (1980), was approached to appear in the film, but declined the offer due to his retirement.

=== Filming ===
Production was slated to begin in July 2016, but on July 1, 2016, screenwriter Zak Penn confirmed that the first week of filming had already been completed, meaning that principal photography began on June 24, 2016. In August and September 2016, filming took place in Birmingham, England, standing in for Columbus, Ohio. Birmingham filming included on Livery Street in the Jewellery Quarter area of the city, which was used for multiple scenes in the film. Ludgate Hill Car Park on Lionel Street, in which caravan homes were partially built, was also used, and a planned explosion there caused some local businesses and residents to call emergency services as no prior notice was given by the production team. Other locations in the city included the former industrial area of Digbeth, and some of the city's landmarks were erased and replaced with CGI buildings to create a dystopian future Ohio. Outside of Birmingham, filming also took place at Warner Bros. Studios, Leavesden and at Solaris House, the former Sun Microsystems headquarters in Surrey. Principal photography wrapped on September 27, 2016.

=== Visual effects ===
Industrial Light & Magic (ILM), Digital Domain, and Territory Studio developed the visual effects, with some pre-visualization work done by The Third Floor. For three hours three days a week, Spielberg met with ILM, which was in charge of the OASIS segments and produced the bulk of the visual effects shots, with 900 in total; Spielberg remarked that "this is the most difficult movie I've done since Saving Private Ryan", as three 3-hour long meetings a week were necessitated to discuss the visual effects. Visual effects supervisor Roger Guyett stated that the VFX team would collaborate with Spielberg and writers Cline and Penn:

What we did at one point was to have a card for every single character that we considered to be a "hero" character within the movie, and we put them up on a board and Steven and everyone else spent hours assigning them to scenes. We'd say, "This is where we want whoever it would be … Batman, Chun-Li, or whoever." And then we went through the whole movie doing that. As the scenes developed, we got an understanding of how many characters we needed.

Part of the film takes place in a virtual space based on the Overlook hotel in Stanley Kubrick's 1980 film The Shining. It was mostly a digital recreation using high-quality telecine of the original film, allowing new camera angles and shots that did not appear in the original. Some original footage from The Shining was also used, with ILM's modifications. Only a few scenes involved real actors (such as the appearance of the Grady twins) and required reproduction of The Shining's physical sets. The Shining sequence was post-processed with film grain and other aging effects to make the new footage closely resemble the original. The VFX team built the Overlook Hotel sequence in the digital realm, consulting Kubrick's blueprints.

ILM also produced digital versions of Ready Player One's many cultural references, including the DeLorean time machine from the Back to the Future films; the Iron Giant; Chucky; and King Kong, modeled after the 1933 film version. The Tyrannosaurus rex from Jurassic Park was created from the base model ILM had created. Digital Domain facilitated pre-visualization (with The Third Floor), motion capture, and virtual sets, and also created 300 visual effects shots for the primarily live-action portions of the film. The virtual sets were powered by game engines and were used congruently with the motion-capture process, with previsualization supervisor Scott Meadows explaining that in real time Spielberg would "put on a headset and scout the sets and make adjustments."

== Soundtrack ==
On June 9, 2016, John Williams was initially going to compose the film's score. However, in July 2017, Williams left the project in favor of scoring Spielberg's The Post, and Alan Silvestri took over scoring duties. The score was released by WaterTower Music as a two-CD set on March 30, 2018, with vinyl and cassette releases projected. At Spielberg's request, Silvestri references his own music from Back to the Future within the film's score, as well as quoting music by other composers, including Max Steiner's theme from King Kong, Akira Ifukube’s main theme from Godzilla, and the score by Wendy Carlos and Rachel Elkind from The Shining.

== Cultural references ==
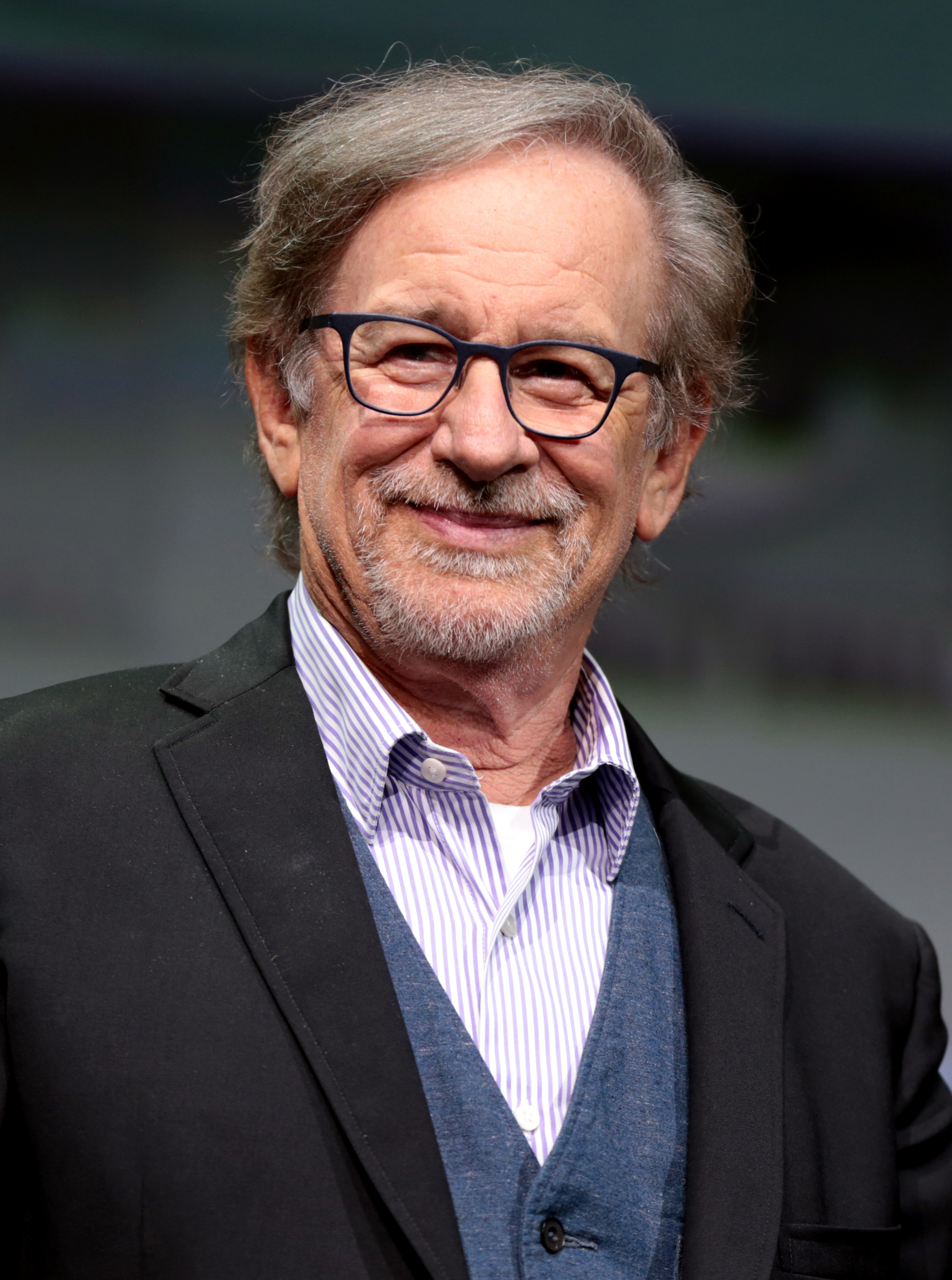
Director Steven Spielberg was reluctant to include references to his own movies for the film, but would eventually include references to the Back to the Future and Jurassic Park franchises.

Ready Player One pays homage to popular culture from various time periods, mainly the 1970s and 1980s but also extending to the 1990s, 2000s and 2010s; reviewers have identified over a hundred references to films, television shows, music, toys, video games, anime, and comics from these eras. Cline did not have any issues with these copyrighted elements when he published the book, but was aware that securing all necessary rights would be a major obstacle for a film adaptation. This task was eventually made easier thanks to Spielberg's reputation in the film industry. In the end, Spielberg estimated that they managed to get about 80% of the copyrighted elements they desired. Somewhat ironically, the production was unable to secure the rights to Spielberg's own Close Encounters of the Third Kind from Columbia Pictures.

The Dungeons & Dragons module Tomb of Horrors features in an important episode of the book, the "Copper Key challenge", but that reference was excluded from the film, where the challenge features a huge car race in New York instead. However, the film does refer to the module: artwork of the Tomb of Horrors demon appears on the back of Aech's van.

Similarly Blade Runner, which was integral to the plot of the book, was shelved as Blade Runner 2049 was in production at the same time as Ready Player One and the producers at Alcon Entertainment feared that Spielberg's film could damage the commercial prospects of their film; as a replacement, the creative team had the players play through the events of The Shining, to which Spielberg was able to secure the rights, as an homage to his friend Stanley Kubrick. Village Roadshow Entertainment Group's library (including Ready Player One) later sold to Alcon Entertainment for $417.5 million on June 18, 2025. Penn and Cline also thought that the film could be the opportunity to replace such a lengthy sequence with a more action-heavy one. Once they decided to use The Shining, they were doubtful at first that Spielberg would accept the change, but Spielberg did go for it. While Cline's original work heavily used the character of Ultraman, the rights over the character were still under legal dispute, requiring them to replace him with the titular robot from The Iron Giant.

Although Spielberg recognized that his films were a significant part of the 1980s popular culture cited in the book, he opted to remove many references to them to avoid accusations of vanity. Cline believed Spielberg wanted to avoid self-references to films he directed, due to the criticism he received for his film 1941, which lampooned his own previous works Jaws and Duel. Cline said he had to convince Spielberg to include some iconic elements, such as the DeLorean time machine from Back to the Future, which Spielberg conceded as he only produced the film. Spielberg also allowed the Tyrannosaurus rex from Jurassic Park to be included. Cline also asked ILM to include a reference to Last Action Hero, one of Penn's first screenplays, without Penn's knowledge; a movie marquee in the Manhattan race segment bears the name "Jack Slater", the character Arnold Schwarzenegger played in that film.

== Release ==
Ready Player One was originally scheduled to be released on December 15, 2017. However, on February 9, 2016, it was delayed to March 30, 2018, to avoid competition with Star Wars: The Last Jedi. In January 2018, it was announced the film's release date had been moved up one day to March 29. The film had its world premiere at the Paramount Theatre in Austin, Texas on March 11, 2018 (as part of the South by Southwest Film Festival). Warner Bros. distributed the film worldwide, with Village Roadshow Pictures distributing in several overseas territories. Around the same time, the massively multi-player online game platform Roblox held an event based on it. The winner of the event was the user r0cu. Warner Bros. released the arcade games Joust, Tapper, Sinistar and Robotron: 2084, which were acquired by the company as part of Midway Games' library and referenced by Cline in the original book, on a promotional website for a limited time; Defender and an original game, First to the Key, were added at a later date.

== Home media ==
Ready Player One was released on digital copy on July 3, 2018, and on 4K UHD Blu-ray, Blu-ray 3D, Blu-ray, and DVD on July 24, 2018. The film debuted at the top of the NPD VideoScan First Alert chart, a tracker of combined domestic Blu-ray and DVD unit sales, for the week ending on July 27, 2018. It retained the No. 1 spot on the chart for the week ending on August 4, 2018.

== Reception ==
=== Box office ===
Ready Player One grossed $137.7 million in the United States and Canada, and $469.5 million in other territories, for a worldwide total of $607 million. Deadline Hollywood had estimated it would need to gross at least $440 million to break even, given its $175 million budget.

In the United States and Canada, Ready Player One was projected to gross $40–50 million from 4,100 theaters over its first four days. It made $12.1 million on its first day, including $3.75 million from Wednesday night previews. It ended up grossing $41.8 million in its opening weekend (for a four-day total of $53.7 million). It made $24.6 million in its second weekend, finishing second behind newcomer A Quiet Place, and $11.5 million in its third weekend, finishing in fourth.

=== Critical response ===
On review aggregator website Rotten Tomatoes, the film holds an approval rating of 71% with an average score of 6.8/10, based on 443 reviews. The site's critical consensus reads, "Ready Player One is a sweetly nostalgic thrill ride that neatly encapsulates Spielberg's strengths while adding another solidly engrossing adventure to his filmography." On Metacritic, the film has a weighted average score of 64 out of 100 based on 56 critics, indicating "generally favorable reviews". Audiences polled by CinemaScore gave the film an average grade of "A−" on an A+ to F scale, and those at PostTrak gave the film an 82% overall positive score and a 65% "definite recommend".

In a review for RogerEbert.com, Brian Tallerico wrote that the film's "overwhelming" nature and non-stop action will likely thrill fans of pop culture; while he observed narrative weaknesses, such as a lack of depth among the supporting characters, he felt that they ultimately do not hinder the film from working "on the level of technical, blockbuster mastery that Spielberg helped define". Writing for Variety, Owen Gleiberman called the film a "coruscating explosion of pop-culture eye candy" and found the sequence based on The Shining to be "irresistible". However, he criticized Spielberg's separation of fantasy and reality, and he said the film has "more activity than it does layers". IndieWire's Eric Kohn characterized the film as "an astonishing sci-fi spectacle and a relentless nostalgia trip at once" and praised both the sequence based on The Shining and Penn's screenplay, particularly with respect to Mendelsohn's character. Nevertheless, he remarked that the film "drags a bunch in its final third". Alissa Wilkinson, writing for Vox, praised both the quality and quantity of the worldbuilding. She also commented on just how dystopian the future portrayed is, where the main characters fight to save the OASIS and the escape from reality it represents, with arguably less concern for the problems of the real world. Film and television critic Matt Zoller Seitz praised Ready Player One and noted the undercurrent of sadness present in the film, stating that "I don't think Spielberg gets enough credit for making sad films that most people interpret as happy, and complex films that are immediately dismissed as simple or confused". Seitz concluded that the film "is a mess, but it is a fascinating and complex one..." In March 2019, a year after the film's release, Seitz determined that with Ready Player One's images commenting on capitalism and popular culture, the film was the second-most "interesting [and] substantive" big-budgeted fantasy in 2018 after Black Panther, admitting that "I still think about [Ready Player One] a lot, especially concerning the world around me."

Monica Castillo was more critical of the film in her review for The Guardian and drew attention to the absence of character arcs, the lack of resolution for plot holes in the novel, and the bloating of scenes in the film by trivia. Alonso Duralde, writing for TheWrap, found the usage of pop culture references lacking, and found his experience watching the film as "feeling bombarded with images, bored by the lack of an interesting story, and irritated with my own cultural past. I've never been much of a video-game player, but by the finale, I was ready to 'Leeroy Jenkins!' my way out of the theater".

== Accolades ==
Award	Date of ceremony	Category	Recipient(s)	Result	Ref(s)
Teen Choice Awards	August 12, 2018	Choice Sci-Fi Movie	Ready Player One	Nominated	
Teen Choice Awards	August 12, 2018	Choice Sci-Fi Movie Actor	Tye Sheridan	Nominated	
Teen Choice Awards	August 12, 2018	Choice Sci-Fi Movie Actress	Olivia Cooke	Nominated	
Teen Choice Awards	August 12, 2018	Choice Breakout Movie Star	Olivia Cooke	Nominated	
Critics' Choice Movie Awards	January 13, 2019	Best Visual Effects	Ready Player One	Nominated	
Visual Effects Society Awards	February 5, 2019	Outstanding Visual Effects in a Photoreal Feature	Roger Guyett, Jennifer Meislohn, Dave Shirk, Matthew E. Butler, Neil Corbould	Nominated	
Visual Effects Society Awards	February 5, 2019	Outstanding Animated Character in a Photoreal Feature	Dave Shirk, Brian Cantwell, Jung-Seung Hong and Kim Ooi for "Art3mis"	Nominated	
Visual Effects Society Awards	February 5, 2019	Outstanding Created Environment in a Photoreal Feature	Mert Yamak, Stanley Wong, Joana Garrido and Daniel Gagiu for "Overlook Hotel"	Won	
Visual Effects Society Awards	February 5, 2019	Outstanding Virtual Cinematography in a Photoreal Project	Daniele Bigi, Edmund Kolloen, Mathieu Vig and Jean-Baptiste Noyau for "New York Race"	Won	
Visual Effects Society Awards	February 5, 2019	Outstanding Model in a Photoreal or Animated Project	Giuseppe Laterza, Kim Lindqvist, Mauro Giacomazzo and William Gallyo for "DeLorean DMC-12"	Nominated	
Satellite Awards	February 17, 2019	Best Visual Effects	Ready Player One	Nominated	
BAFTA Awards	February 10, 2019	Best Special Visual Effects	Matthew E. Butler, Grady Cofer, Roger Guyett, Dave Shirk	Nominated	
Academy Awards	February 24, 2019	Best Visual Effects	Roger Guyett, Grady Cofer, Matthew E. Butler and Dave Shirk	Nominated	
Saturn Awards	September 13, 2019	Best Science Fiction Film	Ready Player One	Won	
Saturn Awards	September 13, 2019	Best Director	Steven Spielberg	Nominated	
Saturn Awards	September 13, 2019	Best Music	Alan Silvestri	Nominated	
Saturn Awards	September 13, 2019	Best Special Effects	Ready Player One	Nominated	

== Legacy ==
Ready Player One's depiction of a pop culture-dominated virtual world drew comparisons to Meta's investments in the metaverse in the early 2020s. Upon the unveiling of the Apple Vision Pro mixed reality headset in 2023, many commentators compared its design to the headsets seen in Ready Player One. A promotional video produced by Apple that accompanied the Vision Pro's announcement also mirrored a scene in Ready Player One in which Wade Watts uses his headset to enter the OASIS.

== Sequel ==
When asked about a sequel to the film, Cline stated: "I think there's a good chance that, if this one does well, Warner Bros. will want to make a sequel. I don't know if Steven [Spielberg] would want to dive back in, because he would know what he is getting into. He's said that it's the third-hardest film he's made, out of dozens and dozens of movies". Cline wrote a book sequel, titled Ready Player Two, which was released on November 24, 2020, stating in the acknowledgments that he had consulted Spielberg on the final draft of the book and where to take a potential film adaptation.

On December 22, 2020, Cline announced that a sequel was in the early stages of development. Spielberg confirmed that the film was still in development as of March 2024, stating that he would not direct the film unlike its predecessor, but produce it. In August 2026, screenwriter Zak Penn confirmed the sequel was still in the works.
