= Ready Player One =

2011 science fiction novel by Ernest Cline

- Trade Paperback Edition
- Author: Ernest Cline
- Audio read by: Wil Wheaton
- Language: English
- Subject: Video games, Virtual Reality
- Genre: LitRPG, science fiction, pop culture fiction, dystopian
- Publisher: Crown Publishing Group
- Publication date: August 16, 2011
- Publication place: United States
- Media type: Print (hardcover and paperback), e-book, audiobook
- Pages: 374
- ISBN: 978-1524763282
- Followed by: Ready Player Two

Ready Player One is a 2011 science fiction novel, and the debut novel of American author Ernest Cline. The story, set in a dystopia in 2045, follows protagonist Wade Watts on his search for an Easter egg in a worldwide virtual reality game, the discovery of which would lead him to inherit the game creator's fortune and the game itself. Cline sold the rights to publish the novel in June 2010, in a bidding war to the Crown Publishing Group (a division of Random House). The book was published on August 16, 2011. An audiobook narrated by Wil Wheaton was released the same day.^{Ch. 20} In 2012, the book received an Alex Award from the Young Adult Library Services Association division of the American Library Association and won the 2011 Prometheus Award.

A film adaptation, screenwritten by Cline and Zak Penn and directed by Steven Spielberg, was released on March 29, 2018. A sequel novel, Ready Player Two, was released on November 24, 2020, to a widely negative critical reception.

== Synopsis ==
=== Setting ===
In the 2040s, the world has been gripped by an energy crisis from the depletion of fossil fuels and the consequences of pollution, global warming, and overpopulation, causing widespread social problems, poverty, and economic stagnation. To escape the decline their world is facing, people turn to the OASIS, (Note: OASIS is an acronym for Ontologically Anthropocentric Sensory Immersive Simulation^{p. 48}) a virtual universe accessible by players using visors and haptic technology such as gloves. It was originally designed as an MMORPG (and so still contains gameplay elements like powerful, unique artifacts), but has evolved into a virtual world used ubiquitously by humanity, with its currency being one of the most stable in the real world. The OASIS was created by James Donovan Halliday, founder of Gregarious Simulation Systems (formerly Gregarious Games). Due to being split into 27 different sectors, the OASIS had its own worlds and zones.

When Halliday died, his will consisted of a video stating to the public that he had left an Easter egg inside the OASIS, and the first person to find it would inherit his entire fortune, ownership of his corporation, and complete control of the OASIS itself, which is worth trillions. To win the contest, a user must find three hidden keys, and use each one to unlock three hidden gates. Halliday's announcement leads to intense competition among "Gunters" (egg hunters) as well as global telecommunications conglomerate Innovative Online Industries (IOI) sponsoring a well-funded effort to find the Easter egg in order to take control of the OASIS and monetize it. However, when the novel begins, five years have passed since Halliday's death, and nobody has found any of the keys. The prologue states that “Then, on the evening of February 11, 2045, an avatar’s name appeared at the top of the Scoreboard, for the whole world to see. After five long years, the Copper Key had finally been found, by an eighteen-year-old kid living in a trailer park on the outskirts of Oklahoma City. That kid was me.” The book is also told from the future saying "Dozens of books, cartoons, movies, and miniseries have attempted to tell the story of everything that happened next, but every single one of them got it wrong. So I want to set the record straight, once and for all.”

=== Plot ===
Eighteen-year-old Wade Watts lives with his Aunt Alice in Oklahoma City in the "stacks", a poverty-stricken district constructed of trailer homes piled on top of each other. He spends his spare time as a gunter, logging into the OASIS as an avatar under the name Parzival, reading Anorak's Almanac, the journal of the OASIS' creator James Halliday, and researching details of 1980s pop culture, mainly classic video games and movies that Halliday loved. After deciphering a riddle hidden in the Almanac, he realizes that the first key is located on the planet Ludus, the same virtual world as his own online high school, in a recreation of the Dungeons & Dragons module Tomb of Horrors. In the tomb, Parzival defeats an AI named Acererak at the video game Joust, and is awarded the Copper Key. His avatar's name appears on a public scoreboard, making him an instant celebrity. While leaving the tomb, he meets Art3mis, a famous female gunter and blogger (and his crush), who had independently discovered the location of the key, but had not yet beaten Acererak.

Parzival completes the First Gate on the planet Middletown, which is modeled after Halliday's childhood home. He plays through the Dungeons of Daggorath video game in a recreation of Halliday's parents' house and then role-plays David Lightman, Matthew Broderick's character in the film WarGames. Art3mis clears the gate shortly afterwards, as does Wade's best friend Aech. Wade's fame enables him to make a living by endorsing virtual products. It also brings him to the attention of Nolan Sorrento, head of operations at IOI. When Wade refuses to join IOI, Sorrento attempts to kill him by blowing up the trailer where Wade lives, killing his aunt and disguising the explosion as an accident.

Wade (who had not been in his trailer at the time of the explosion), escapes and moves to Columbus, Ohio (hometown of both GSS and IOI), where he assumes the pseudonym Bryce Lynch and lives in an anonymous apartment designed for hardcore OASIS users. He grows increasingly close with Art3mis, but when he confesses his feelings towards her, she declares that their relationship had been a mistake and ghosts him. Wade becomes much more serious about the hunt. He decides not to leave his apartment until he has found the egg.

After five months, Art3mis finally finds the Jade Key. On the planet Archaide, Parzival stumbles across a hidden recreation of an arcade from Halliday's hometown in which he finds a Pac-Man arcade machine, with the high score set to 3,333,350 (10 points under the maximum score). Unsure as to whether it is relevant to the hunt, he decides to play a perfect game of Pac-Man and receives a quarter that cannot leave his inventory as a prize. Aech, after finding the Jade Key, provides a hint leading him to the planet Frobozz where he solves a recreation of the text adventure game Zork and whistles a 2600-hertz-sound through a Cap'n Crunch Bo'Sun whistle, awarding him the Jade Key. IOI establishes a base on Frobozz to farm Jade Keys for their company's avatars, unlocks the second Gate, and rapidly acquires the Crystal Key. Shoto, another high ranking gunter, tells Parzival that IOI have killed his friend Daito, passing it off as a suicide.

Parzival finds the Second Gate hidden in a Voight-Kampff machine from Blade Runner, and completes a remake of the arcade game Black Tiger. He is awarded a giant, usable mecha as a prize and is given a clue to the Crystal Key. He acquires the Crystal Key on the planet Syrinx, and after playing the "Discovery" section of the song "2112", finds a hidden clue regarding the conditions to unlock the final gate. As Parzival messages Art3mis, Aech, and Shoto with instructions on how to get through the Second Gate and obtain the Crystal Key, IOI finds the Third Gate in Halliday's private stronghold, Castle Anorak on the planet Chthonia. They use a powerful artifact to create an indestructible and impenetrable force field around the gate, but as they missed the hidden clue that Wade found, cannot determine how to open the gate.

Wade manipulates his assumed identity in order to be arrested and placed in indentured servitude in IOI's tech support department. He then uses black market passwords and security exploits to hack into IOI's intranet and deploy a timed booby trap to bring down the force field. He also acquires a wealth of incriminating information: footage of Daito's murder (also discovering that IOI had tracked him down by illegally tracing his bandwidth signal), records of the attempt on his own life, as well as plans to abduct Shoto and Art3mis and force them to find the Easter egg for IOI, then kill them afterwards. After escaping the corporation, he shares this information with his friends and news outlets, and sends out a message inviting all OASIS avatars to help them storm the castle. Parzival and his friends are interrupted by Ogden "Og" Morrow (the co-creator of the OASIS), who offers them a safe haven at his home in Oregon. Wade meets the real-life Aech and Og, but not Art3mis or Shoto.

Wade's booby trap successfully disables the force field, and a massive fight among avatars ensues. Parzival, Art3mis, Aech and Shoto use their mechas to fight Sorrento's Mechagodzilla Kiryu, though Parzival has to use an Ultraman artifact (obtained in a quest with Daito and Shoto) to defeat and kill Sorrento's mecha and avatar. When it becomes clear they will lose the battle, IOI detonates a doomsday device, which destroys Castle Anorak and kills every avatar present in the sector. Parzival survives, discovering the quarter he first obtained in Archaide was an artifact that granted him an extra life. In the final gate, he plays Tempest, role-plays King Arthur and various other characters in Monty Python and the Holy Grail, and retrieves the Easter egg in Adventure, the game with the first ever Easter egg. His victory grants him control of the OASIS, and makes him a multi-billionaire. Sorrento and those involved are arrested for the murder of Daito and conspiring to kill Wade and the others.

Back in Oregon, Wade and Art3mis, whose real name is Samantha, meet in person and rekindle their relationship with a kiss. Wade remarks that, for the first time in as long as he can remember, he has no desire to log into the OASIS.

== Characters ==
- Wade Owen Watts a.k.a. Parzival: The viewpoint character, an orphan living with his Aunt Alice in the "stacks", a poverty-stricken area in Oklahoma City, Oklahoma, ever since his father was shot during a looting and his mother Loretta who worked at OASIS died of a drug addiction. Wade names his OASIS character Parzival after the Arthurian knight involved in the quest for the holy grail. Wade's character was based on a mix of Cline as well as his geek friends.
- James Donovan Halliday a.k.a. Anorak the All Knowing: The creator of OASIS. His avatar's name is based on a British slang term for an obsessive geek. His character was initially inspired by Willy Wonka who Cline described as a "rich eccentric holding a fantastic contest". Cline used the personalities of Howard Hughes and Richard Garriott, and placed Halliday's birth year around the same as his own so that his pop culture interests would coincide with Cline's "and the other middle-aged uber-geeks I know". His avatar of Anorak the All Knowing resembles a tall wizard in black robes.
- Aech (pronounced like the letter H^{Ch. 33}) a.k.a. Helen Harris: Wade's best friend, fellow gunter, and rival in the quest to find the egg. Although Aech's avatar is an athletic white heterosexual male,^{p. 38–39} Aech's real world form is a heavyset African-American lesbian named Helen Harris, who grew up in Atlanta, Georgia and is about the same age as Wade.^{Ch. 33} Aech is based partly on Cline's friend Harry Knowles as well as himself and other geeks, both men and women.
- Samantha Evelyn Cook a.k.a. Art3mis: A famous female gunter and blogger. She chose her avatar's name from the Greek goddess of the hunt. (Note: Art3mis chose the leet spelling as her username because the original spelling was already taken.^{p. 93}) Like other characters, Cline based Art3mis on himself and other geeks, both men and women. Her avatar is a stocky female with short hair that is described as being raven-colored and the length of Joan of Arc’s.
- Ogden "Og" Morrow a.k.a. The Great and Powerful Og: Co-creator of the OASIS and best friend of James Halliday. His appearance and personality are described in the book as being "a cross between Albert Einstein and Santa Claus". Og's character and relationship with Halliday were inspired by Steve Jobs and Steve Wozniak, with Morrow being more like Jobs as a "charismatic tech leader", while his avatar's name is inspired by the Wizard of Oz.
- Daito: One of the two Japanese gunters who rise to the top of the scoreboard early on in the hunt, working in a team with his "brother" Shoto. He took his avatar's name from the name of the long sword in a daisho set, which is a katana on its own. They are both based on otaku: Japanese geeks who enjoy movies and anime, as well as hikikomori: people who live as recluses inside their family's homes, referred to in the book as "the Missing Millions". Daito's real name is revealed to be Toshiro Yoshiaki after he is killed by IOI.
- Shoto: The second and younger of the two Japanese gunters working as a team in their quest for the egg.^{p. 129} He took his avatar's name from the name of the shorter sword of a daisho set, which is a wakizashi on its own. Shoto's real name is Akihide Karatsu.^{p. 292}
- Nolan Sorrento a.k.a. IOI-655321: The head of operations at Innovative Online Industries (IOI), the multinational corporation that serves as an Internet service provider for most of the world. Cline said that he named Sorrento after Nolan Bushnell, founder of the video game company Atari and said "Not that I think Nolan is a bad guy or anything. It's meant as a subtle tribute!"
- Alice: The aunt of Wade who takes care of him when his parents have died. She has dated different abusive boyfriends and had a poor relationship with Wade. Alice was later killed when IOI bombed her trailer.
- Rick: An ex-con who is Alice's latest boyfriend. He often mistreats Wade. Rick was later killed when IOI bombed Alice's trailer.
- Ms. Guilmore: An older lady who is kind to Wade Watts in the stacks.

== Reception ==
=== Contemporary ===
Ready Player One was a New York Times bestseller.

Among those praising the book were Entertainment Weekly, The Boston Globe, The A.V. Club, CNN.com, io9 and Boing Boing. USA Today wrote that the novel "undoubtedly qualifies Cline as the hottest geek on the planet right now." NPR said that the book was "ridiculously fun and large-hearted". Cline "takes a far-out premise and engages the reader instantly" with a "deeply felt narrative [that] makes it almost impossible to stop turning the pages." Janet Maslin of The New York Times wrote that "The book gets off to a witty start" but noted that it lacks at least one dimension, stating that gaming had overwhelmed everything else about this book. Rebecca Serle of HuffPost described the book as "the grown-up's Harry Potter" and that it "has it all – nostalgia, trivia, adventure, romance, heart and, dare I say it, some very fascinating social commentary." The book has been translated into over 20 languages.

=== Retrospective ===
Discussion on the book was renewed in the months leading up to the release of Steven Spielberg's film adaptation. In contrast to the book's contemporary reviews, which were generally positive, these were substantially more negative and triggered a social media backlash towards the book and the then-upcoming film adaptation. Upon the release of the film's trailer in July 2017 various passages from the book quickly became viral on Twitter and other social media platforms, mocking Cline's writing style and the book's extensive use of 80s pop culture references. Nick Shager, writing for The Daily Beast shortly before the release of the film adaptation, offered a scathing review that criticized the book's narrative style by stating "It's... a terribly written piece of adolescent fantasy that, at heart, exemplifies everything wrong and repellent about modern nerd culture" and challenged its coming-of-age premise by calling it "a stunted-adolescent story". Regarding the abundance of pop culture references, Shager called the book "an unbearable celebration of nostalgic juvenilia". He summarized his argument against the book by stating "It's a lionization of immature things (and immaturity) as an end to itself, rather than as the building blocks of more mature – and worthwhile – creations". Shager also lamented the book's "Peter Pan-ish infatuation with childishness, which comes coated in a stench of stale Doritos, Jolt Cola and lowbrow smugness".

Shortly after the book was published, Gamergate became a focal point in the culture wars during the 2010s. This led some critics to re-examine Ready Player One and accuse it of pandering towards more toxic elements of online gamer culture. Constance Grady of Vox wrote that "for readers in Cline's target demographic in 2011, [the book] felt empowering. For readers who weren't, it felt like a harmless piece of affirmation meant for someone else. Everyone deserves a silly escapist fantasy, right? [...] But in this world [...] only things that affect straight white dudes really matter". Writer Chris Isaac of Tor disagreed with these criticisms, stating that the backlash towards the book was an overcorrection in response to backlashes against similar books aimed at an audience of young women, such as Stephenie Meyer's Twilight series. He notes a then-recent video essay from young adult author Lindsay Ellis, previously dismissive of Meyer's writings, that defended the writing of the Twilight books while singling out Ready Player One for its writing. Isaac wrote: "I don't think the lesson from Twilight should be that Ready Player One needs to be blasted in the same fashion, but rather that you can acknowledge the flaws of something without joining a hate mob or attacking anyone else for enjoying it. By the end of Twilight's shelf life, people talking about how much they disliked the series had become far more tiresome than those who enjoyed it."

=== Podcast ===
Michael J. Nelson and Conor Lastowka's book review podcast series 372 Pages We'll Never Get Back was named after the number of pages that comprise the book's paperback edition. The book was the inaugural subject of the podcast, which reviews literature the hosts consider of dubious quality. They criticized the book's "defective" worldbuilding, referred to its pop culture references as being repetitive and excessive in place of descriptive writing, and described the plot as weak.

== Continuation ==
=== Short story ===
"Lacero", a fan-fiction short story by Andy Weir, was published online in 2014, and later included in the 2016 limited edition of Ready Player One published by Subterranean Press.

It functions as a precursor to the main novel, and is considered canonical to the Ready Player One fictional universe.

=== Sequel novel ===
As early as 2015, Cline had been reported to be working on a sequel to Ready Player One from screenwriter Zak Penn. Cline confirmed the sequel was in progress by December 2017, and would have a different story-line involving all of the characters, while still exploring pop culture references like the first book. Penguin House released the sequel, Ready Player Two on November 24, 2020. The plot follows Wade as he embarks on a new quest after discovering a new technology developed by Halliday. Between the weeks of November 29 and December 20 of 2020, it was number one on Amazon's fiction chart.

== In other media ==
=== Easter egg hunt promotion ===
Ten months after the first edition's release, Cline revealed on his blog that Ready Player One itself contained an elaborately hidden Easter egg. This clue would form the first part of a series of staged video gaming tests, similar to the plot of the novel. Cline also revealed that the competition's grand prize would be a DeLorean. The Easter egg was a URL hidden in the book for anoraksalmanac.com. This was the first stage of the contest where the 2011 Atari 2600 game The Stacks by developers Mike Mika & Kevin Wilson was featured. The game Ultimate Collector: Garage Sale by Austin-based developer Portalarium was featured in the second stage of the contest. The final stage of the contest was announced on August 1, 2012, and was to set a world record on one of several classic arcade or Atari 2600 games. This was completed on August 9, 2012, by Craig Queen, who set a new world record in Joust. He was awarded the DeLorean on the TV series X-Play.

=== Gamergate criticism ===
The review of Ready Player One in a "post-gamergate cultural landscape" was mostly negative towards Ready Player One. The controversy arose when reviewers who went back to review Ready Player One highlighted the "embodiment" of Gamergate's gatekeeping culture, where "nerd trivia" is used as a currency and a social involvement. It also involved controversies where it the books main protagonist, Wade Watts, shows signs of possible objectifying the supporting protagonist of Art3mis, leading to controversies of misogyny.

=== Film adaptation ===
The film rights were purchased by Warner Bros. on the same day Cline finalized his publishing deal with Random House, one year prior to the novel's publication. Dan Farah brought the project into the studio and produced it with Donald De Line. Cline adapted his novel into a screenplay. Over the years, Eric Eason and Zak Penn assisted Cline with rewrites.

Steven Spielberg signed on to direct in March 2015. Spielberg and Kristie Macosko Krieger of Amblin Partners also joined Deline and Farah as producers. Warner Bros. initially announced a release date of December 15, 2017. On February 9, 2016, the release date was pushed back to March 30, 2018, to avoid competition with Star Wars: The Last Jedi. The movie began production in the spring of 2016 and was filmed in both the United States and the United Kingdom.

On June 9, 2016, Variety stated that Spielberg's regular collaborator John Williams was planning on composing the film's score. However, scheduling conflicts with another Spielberg film, The Post, led to Spielberg signing Alan Silvestri for the score.

The film stars Tye Sheridan, Olivia Cooke, Ben Mendelsohn, Lena Waithe, T. J. Miller, Simon Pegg, and Mark Rylance with Philip Zao, Win Morisaki, and Hannah John-Kamen in supporting roles. It premiered at South by Southwest on March 11, 2018, and was theatrically released by Warner Bros. in the United States on March 29, 2018. It received generally positive reviews from critics who praised its visuals and brisk pacing, the performances of Sheridan and Rylance, and noted it as an improvement on the book. The film nonetheless received criticism for its lack of character development and its "achingly regressive" view of pop culture fans.

== See also ==
- Virtual reality in fiction
- LitRPG
- Metaverse
- Second Life
- VRChat

== Notes ==
- The terms "Ch." and "p." are shortened forms for chapter and page, and refer to chapters and pages in the Ready Player One novel in its first American edition.
