= Amanda McKittrick Ros =

Irish writer

- Born: Anna Margaret McKittrick; 8 December 1860; Drumaness, County Down, Ireland
- Died: 2 February 1939 (aged 78); Larne, County Antrim, Northern Ireland
- Education: Marlborough Teacher Training College
- Occupations: Teacher, novelist, poet
- Spouse: Andrew Ross (m. 1887)
- Writing career
- Language: English
- Notable works: Irene Iddesleigh, Delina Delaney

Anna Margaret Ross (née McKittrick; 8 December 1860 – 2 February 1939), known by her pen-name Amanda McKittrick Ros, was an Irish writer. She published her first novel Irene Iddesleigh at her own expense in 1897. However, it was reprinted by Nonesuch Press in 1926; the reprint sold out immediately. She wrote poetry and a number of novels. She has been described as a "writer with an immense power of words but uncertain use of them."

== Life ==
McKittrick was born in Drumaness, County Down, on 8 December 1860, the fourth child of Eliza Black and Edward Amlave McKittrick, Principal of Drumaness High School. She was christened Anna Margaret at Third Ballynahinch Presbyterian Church on 27 January 1861. In the 1880s she attended Marlborough Teacher Training College in Dublin, was appointed Monitor at Millbrook National School, Larne, County Antrim, finished her training at Marlborough and then became a qualified teacher at the same school.

During her first visit to Larne she met Andrew Ross, a widower of 35, who was station master there. She married him at Joymount Presbyterian Church, Carrickfergus, County Antrim, on 30 August 1887.

Her husband financed the publication of Irene Iddesleigh as a gift to Ros on their tenth wedding anniversary, thus launching her literary career. She went on to write three novels and dozens of poems. In 1917 Andrew Ross died, and in 1922 Ros married Thomas Rodgers (1857/58–1933), a County Down farmer.

Ros died at the Royal Victoria Hospital in Belfast on 2 February 1939, under the name "Hannah Margaret Rodgers".

== Writing ==
Holy Moses! Take a look!
Flesh decayed in every nook!
Some rare bits of brain lie here,
Mortal loads of beef and beer.

— Amanda M. Ros, poem "On Visiting Westminster Abbey" from Fumes of Formation

She wrote under the pen name Amanda McKittrick Ros, possibly in an attempt to suggest a connection to the noble de Ros family of County Down. Ros was strongly influenced by the novelist Marie Corelli. She wrote: "My chief object of writing is and always has been, to write if possible in a strain all my own. This I find is why my writings are so much sought after." She imagined "the million and one who thirst for aught that drops from my pen", and predicted that she would "be talked about at the end of a thousand years."

She also wrote ballads under the pseudonym Monica Moyland.

Her "admirers" included Aldous Huxley, Siegfried Sassoon, C. S. Lewis and Mark Twain. Her novel Irene Iddesleigh was published in 1897. Twain considered Irene "one of the greatest unintentionally humorous novels of all time". A reader sent a copy of Irene to humourist Barry Pain, who in an 1898 review called it "a thing that happens once in a million years", and sarcastically termed it "the book of the century". He reported that he was initially entertained, but soon "shrank before it in tears and terror". Ros retorted by branding Pain a "clay crab of corruption" and wrote a twenty-page preface to her second novel, Delina Delaney, in which she disparaged Pain at length and suggested that he was so hostile only because he was secretly in love with her. But Ros claimed to have made enough money from Delina Delaney to build a house, which she named Iddesleigh.

In Ros's last novel, Helen Huddleson, all the characters are named after various fruits: Lord Raspberry, Cherry Raspberry, Sir Peter Plum, Christopher Currant, the Earl of Grape, Madame Pear. Of Pear, Ros wrote: "she had a swell staff of sweet-faced helpers swathed in stratagem, whose members and garments glowed with the lust of the loose, sparkled with the tears of the tortured, shone with the sunlight of bribery, dangled with the diamonds of distrust, slashed with sapphires of scandals..."

Ros wrote that her critics lacked sufficient intellect to appreciate her talent, and that they conspired against her for revealing the corruption of society's ruling classes, thereby disturbing "the bowels of millions".

== Legacy ==
In Mrs Ros we see, as we see in the Elizabethan novelists, the result of the discovery of art by an unsophisticated mind and of its first conscious attempt to produce the artistic... The first attempts of any people to be consciously literary are always productive of the most elaborate artificiality... The Euphuists were not barbarians making their first discovery of literature, but in one thing they were unsophisticated: they were discovering prose.

— Aldous Huxley

Literary critic Northrop Frye said of Ros's novels that they use "rhetorical material without being able to absorb or assimilate it: the result is pathological, a kind of literary diabetes".

Nick Page, author of In Search of the World's Worst Writers, rated Ros the worst of the worst. He says that "[F]or Amanda, eyes are 'piercing orbs', legs are 'bony supports', people do not blush, they are 'touched by the hot hand of bewilderment'". Jack Loudan said that "Amanda is the most perfect instrument for measuring the sense of humour. Alert and quick-witted people accept her at once: those she leaves entirely unmoved are invariably dull and unimaginative". The Oxford Companion to Irish Literature described her as "uniquely dreadful".

In a 2024 op-ed for The Washington Post, comedian Andrew Doyle argued that Ros "knew exactly what she was doing" and that most of her works were written to be intentionally humorous. While he writes that he has "little doubt that her first novel was published in earnest", Doyle points out that Ros's most-mocked tendencies expanded and escalated over time, and compares her to a modern-day Internet troll. He further comments "There are so many elements of Ros's novels and poems clearly meant to be funny that I find it astonishing they have been so misinterpreted".

=== Availability ===
Belfast Central Library has an archive of her papers. The Frank Ferguson-edited collection Ulster-Scots Writing: An Anthology (Four Courts, 2008) includes her poetry.

On 11 November 2006, as part of a 50-year celebration, librarian Elspeth Legg hosted a major retrospective of her works, culminating in a public reading by 65 delegates of the entire contents of Fumes of Formation. The theme of the workshop that followed was 'Suppose you chance to write a book', Line 17 of 'Myself' from page 2 of Fumes of Formation.

A biography by Jack Loudan, O Rare Amanda!, was published in 1954. A collection of her most memorable passages was published in 1988, edited by Frank Ormsby, under the title Thine in Storm and Calm.

Belfast Public Libraries have a large collection of manuscripts, typescripts and first editions of her work. Manuscript copies include Irene Iddesleigh, Sir Benjamin Bunn and Six Months in Hell. Typescript versions of all the above are held together with Rector Rose, St. Scandal Bags and The Murdered Heiress among others. The collection of first editions covers all her major works including volumes of her poetry, Fumes of Formation and Poems of Puncture, together with lesser known pieces such as Kaiser Bill and Donald Dudley: The Bastard Critic. The collection includes hundreds of letters addressed to Ros, many with her own comments in the margins. Also included are typed copies of her letters to newspapers, correspondence with her admiring publisher T. S. Mercer, an album of newspaper cuttings and photographs, and a script for a BBC broadcast from July 1943. In 2007 her life and works were fêted at a Belfast literary festival.

=== In popular culture ===
The Oxford literary group the Inklings, which included C. S. Lewis and J. R. R. Tolkien, held competitions to see who could read Ros's work aloud for the longest time without laughing.

Denis Johnston, the Irish playwright, wrote a radio play entitled Amanda McKittrick Ros which was broadcast on BBC Home Service radio on 25 July 1943 and subsequently. The play is published in The Dramatic Works of Denis Johnston vol. 3. Johnston acquired a collection of papers from Ros including the unfinished typescript of Helen Huddleson. These can now be seen as part of the Denis Johnston collection in the library of the Ulster University at Coleraine, Northern Ireland.

== Bibliography ==
- Irene Iddesleigh (novel, 1897)
- Delina Delaney (novel, 1898)
- Poems of Puncture (poetry, 1912)
- Kaiser Bill (broadsheet, 1915)
- A Little Belgian Orphan (broadsheet, 1916)
- Fumes of Formation (poetry, 1933)
- Bayonets of Bastard Sheen (poetry, 1949)
- St. Scandalbags (poetry, 1954)
- Donald Dudley: Tha Bastard Critic (poetry, 1954)
- Helen Huddleson (posthumous novel, 1969)
- O Rare Amanda!: The Life of Amanda McKittrick Ros Jack Loudan (London: Chatto & Windus 1954)
- Thine in Storm and Calm — An Amanda McKittrick Ros Reader, edited by Frank Ormsby (The Blackstaff Press, 1988.)
- The Dramatic Works of Denis Johnston vol. 3 (Gerrards Cross: Colin Smythe, 1992.)

== See also ==
- List of Northern Irish writers
- Robert Coates
- The Eye of Argon
- Edward Bulwer-Lytton
- Chuck Tingle
- William McGonagall
- James McIntyre
- Julia A. Moore
- List of the Lost
- My Immortal
