= Ernest Cline =

American novelist, slam poet, and screenwriter (born 1972)

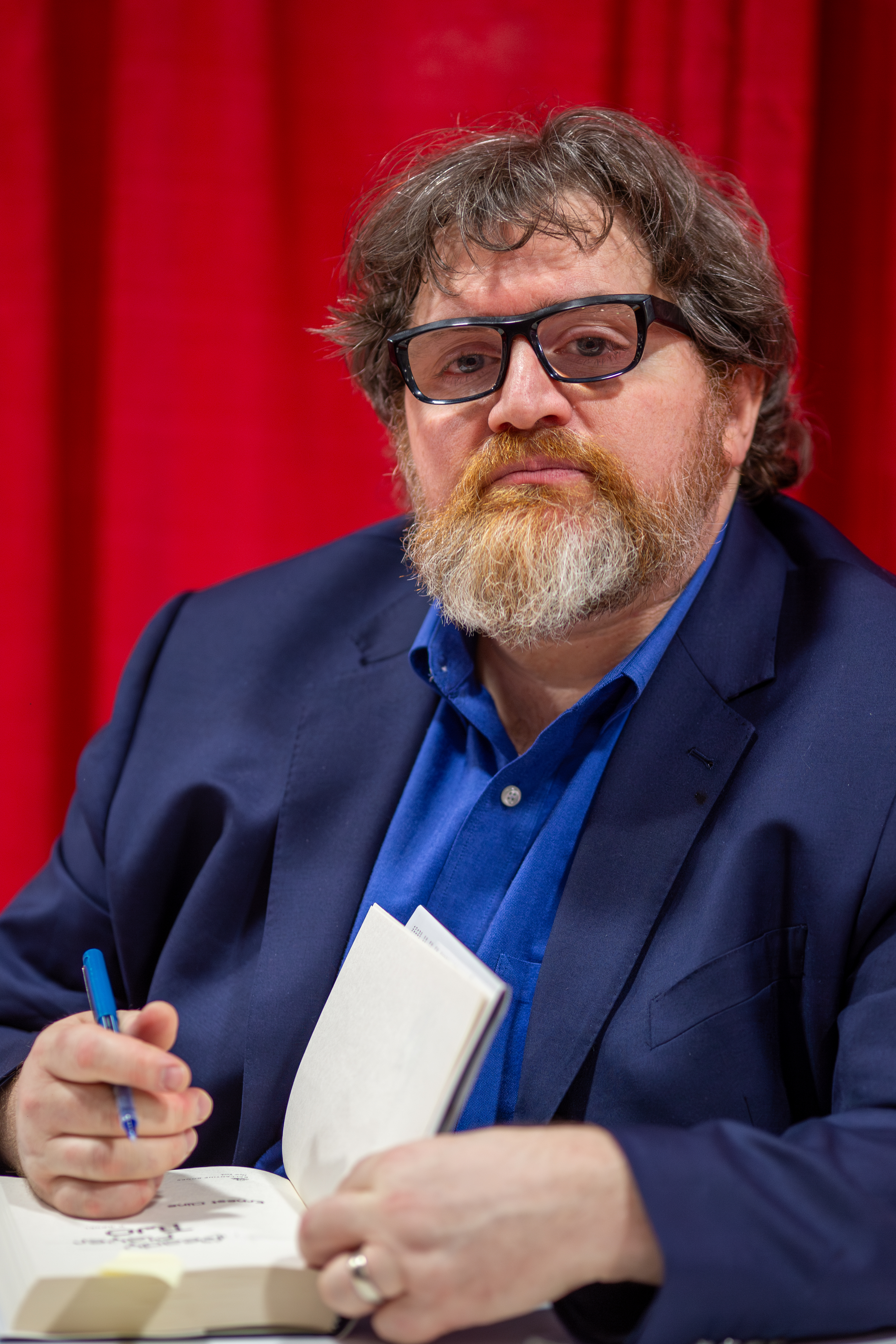
- Cline at the 2024 National Book Festival
- Born: Ernest Christy Cline; March 29, 1972 (age 54); Ashland, Ohio, U.S.
- Occupations: Novelist; screenwriter; artist; poet
- Spouses: Susan Somers-Willett (m. 2003; div. 2013); Cristin O'Keefe Aptowicz (m. 2016)
- Website: www.ernestcline.com

Ernest Christy Cline (born March 29, 1972) is an American science fiction novelist, slam poet and screenwriter. He wrote the novels Ready Player One, Armada, and Ready Player Two, and co-wrote the screenplay for the film adaptation of Ready Player One, directed by Steven Spielberg.

== Life and career ==
Cline was born and raised in Ashland, Ohio, the son of Ernest Cline and Faye Imogene Cline. As a youth in the 1970s and 1980s, Cline was "addicted to video games and movies," especially Star Wars, the movies of John Hughes, and the tabletop roleplaying game Dungeons & Dragons. He worked in information technology in his twenties and worked on screenwriting during his spare time.

=== Fanboys ===
Cline co-wrote the screenplay for Fanboys, based on a story he had developed in the late 1990s while his mother was dying of cancer. Cline shot some low-budget scenes himself and shared his screenplay draft with Harry Knowles, whose connections in the film industry helped Cline get the film produced. The final film was co-written by Adam F. Goldberg and directed by Kyle Newman. It was finally released in 2009 after reshoots, re-edits, and delays. Cline later recalled that the film "changed my whole life. Fanboys is my first real original screenplay, and it got made."

=== Spoken word ===
From 1997 to 2001, Cline performed his original work at Austin Poetry Slam venues. He was the Austin Poetry Slam Champ in 1998 and 2001. Cline also competed on the Austin Poetry Slam Teams at the 1998 Austin National Poetry Slam and the 2001 Seattle National Poetry Slam. His most popular spoken-word pieces include "Dance, Monkeys, Dance," "Nerd Porn Auteur," and "When I Was a Kid." Cline subsequently reworked "Dance, Monkeys, Dance" into a faux educational filmstrip, which became a popular viral video that has now been translated into 29 different languages.

In 2001, Cline self-published a chapbook collection of his spoken-word writing, The Importance of Being Ernest, and released an album, The Geek Wants Out. In the fall of 2013, Write Bloody Publishing published a new edition of The Importance of Being Ernest with new cover art by Gary Musgrave and new interior illustrations by Len Peralta.

=== Books ===
In June 2010, Cline sold his first novel, Ready Player One, a book that takes place in a dystopian 2040s. The book was sold in a bidding war to the Crown Publishing Group (a division of Random House). The film rights to the novel were sold the following day, to Warner Bros., with Cline co-writing the screenplay. Ten months later, with the hardcover release coinciding with the paperback release, Cline revealed on his blog that both the paperback and hardcover editions of Ready Player One contain an elaborately hidden Easter egg. This clue formed the first part of a series of staged video gaming tests, similar to the plot of the novel. Cline also revealed that the competition's grand prize would be a 1981 DeLorean. The prize was awarded in 2012. The paperback is currently in its 17th printing.

Cline's second novel, Armada, was released on July 14, 2015, by Crown Publishing Group. In December 2015 the film rights to Armada were sold to Universal Pictures for a seven-figure sum.

His third novel, Ready Player Two was announced in August 2015 and released on November 24, 2020 as a sequel to Ready Player One. As of 2020, a film adaptation of the novel was in early development.

His fourth novel, Bridge to Bat City was announced in June 2023 and released by Little, Brown and Company on April 9, 2024. It is Cline's first children’s novel, described as a “'mostly true tall tale' about a recently orphaned young girl named Opal B Flats, who forms an unexpected friendship with a music-loving colony of bats and helps them find a new home against all odds."

=== Readyverse ===
In January 2024, it was announced that Cline has partnered with tech company Futureverse Studios to launch the Readyverse, “a multi-world, multi-IP, interoperable open metaverse experience for mass consumers.” Readyverse will feature licensed digital props and other intellectual property from director Steven Spielberg’s Ready Player One through a deal with distributor Warner Bros. Readyverse also holds the rights to Cline’s other novels (including Ready Player Two) as well as his future works.

=== Personal life ===
From 2003 to 2013, Cline was married to author Susan Somers-Willett, with whom he has one daughter.

In 2016, he married writer Cristin O'Keefe Aptowicz, whom he met at the 1998 National Poetry Slam and began dating in 2013. They have one daughter.

Cline's all-time favorite video game is Black Tiger, which features prominently in the plot of Ready Player One.

== Bibliography ==
=== Novels ===
Ready Player One series:

1. Ready Player One (2011)
2. Ready Player Two (2020)

Standalone:

- Armada (2015)
- Bridge to Bat City (2024)

=== Short stories ===
- "The Omnibot Incident" (2014), short story in Robot Uprisings, anthology edited by Daniel H. Wilson and John Joseph Adams.

=== Poetry ===
- The Importance of Being Ernest (2013)

== Adaptations ==
- Ready Player One (2018), film directed by Steven Spielberg, based on novel Ready Player One
