= The Mister =

2019 novel by E. L. James

- Author: E. L. James
- Audio read by: Dominic Thorburn, Jessica O'Hara-Baker
- Language: English
- Genre: Romance
- Set in: London, Cornwall and Albania, 2019
- Published: 16 April 2019
- Publisher: Vintage Books
- Publication place: United Kingdom
- Media type: Print: paperback
- Pages: 624
- ISBN: 978-1984898326
- Dewey Decimal: 823.92
- Website: www.eljamesauthor.com/books/the-mister/

The Mister is a 2019 romance novel by E. L. James.

== Plot ==
English aristocrat Maxim Trevelyan inherits the Earldom of Trevethick following the sudden death of his elder brother, Kit. He develops feelings for his housekeeper, Alessia Demachi, an undocumented Albanian immigrant. After two strangers arrive at his London apartment searching for Alessia, Maxim takes her to his residence in Cornwall for her safety. While there, Maxim begins a sexual relationship with Alessia but conceals his noble title. When Alessia discovers Maxim is an earl, she attempts to leave him but is unsuccessful; they later reconcile. Alessia reveals she is fleeing an abusive fiancé, who subsequently kidnaps her, prompting Maxim to travel to Albania to find her. Maxim eventually reaches Alessia's family home and asks for her hand in marriage. Alessia arrives shortly afterward, reveals the truth about her fiancé to her father, and she and Maxim marry.

== Reception ==
The Guardian described the novel as "A coked-up lord bonks a trafficked Albanian immigrant as the Fifty Shades of Grey author swaps BDSM for dispiritingly creepy power games," adding that "there is a complete dearth of emotional maturity that is genuinely unsettling." Jezebel wrote that "the narrative is so committed to sexualizing Alessia's vulnerability and powerlessness that the result is offensive." The Atlantic called it "hopelessly retrograde and dismally unentertaining." In a positive review, Booklist stated that "the book's belief in the infinitely transformative power of love will hit the sweet spot for readers looking to be swept away."

== Film adaptation ==
On 25 February 2020 Variety announced that Universal Pictures would produce a film adaptation of The Mister.
