= The Lost Daughter (soundtrack) =

2021 film score

The Lost Daughter (Soundtrack from the Netflix Film)

Film score by Dickon Hinchliffe
- Released: December 17, 2021
- Recorded: 2021
- Studio: Abbey Road Studios, London
- Genre: Film score
- Length: 38:18
- Label: Milan
- Producer: Dickon Hinchliffe

Dickon Hinchliffe chronology
Above Suspicion (2021)	The Lost Daughter (2021)	Father Stu (2022)

The Lost Daughter (Soundtrack from the Netflix Film) is the film score soundtrack to the 2021 film The Lost Daughter directed by Maggie Gyllenhaal, starring Olivia Colman, Dakota Johnson, Jessie Buckley, Paul Mescal, Dagmara Domińczyk, Jack Farthing, Oliver Jackson-Cohen, Peter Sarsgaard, and Ed Harris. The score was composed by Dickon Hinchliffe and released through Milan Records on December 17, 2021.

== Development ==
"One of the first things Maggie said, she had this concept and she didn't know if it would work: the music would be like a found record, like a vinyl album from the past, a vintage one from the '50s or '60s. You'd put it on to play and it would somehow magically work with the film and be its film score [...] It's a great idea and got me going in terms of writing thematically and writing in a way that I was writing music that could exist outside the film, like a record, which was a really interesting approach [...] The whole process developed from there. It's a combination of that approach combined with that she wanted a vintage and analog sound. She almost shot it like an old french or Italian film, but the themes of the film are not the kind of films dealt with in the '50s or '60s. That's what makes it such interesting friction at work there."

— Dickon Hinchliffe, on the score for The Lost Daughter

Dickon Hinchliffe of Tindersticks composed the film score. During the initial conversations with Maggie, she wanted the music to have a character of its own by engage with the incidents happened in the storytelling and with the characters, rather than playing the supporting role. Hinchliffe recalled that she described the score to be like a vinyl record from the 1950s and 1960s, playing in the background, which he called it a really lovely idea which set him off writing. Hinchliffe refrained from using digital instrumentation, and went ahead with real instruments that accompanied small strings, upright bass, drums, piano and a Hammond organ, that was used in old records; Hinchliffe added "it's an organ but you can get it to sound really creepy and it's got this cabinet on it that creates this amazing throbbing sound". For recording the Hammond organ, he used old microphones, while the strings were recorded at Abbey Road Studios, using old ribbon mics and mixed through a vintage EMI mixing desk, which was used by The Beatles, this process provided them "a lovely, rich sound that has a warmth and a bit of bite."

Hinchliffe recalled one of the few sequences, which he scored was when Leda having flashbacks to her younger self with her kids. He underscored it with a melody that had a "childlike simplicity and naivety to it on the piano" and mixed with the darker and disturbing tones to combine the joy that Leda had as a mother with the depression that she felt. The film's tonal shifts were considered challenging, which resulted in Hinchliffe writing few themes. Leda's theme started the film, and Hinchliffe did variations of that cue depending on those tonal shifts. Towards the end, the theme had a "distorted" and "fragmented" version. As the film asks numerous questions that were left unanswered, much of the music would not settle on anything and Hinchliffe would write it in an open way rather than telling audience how to feel.

== Release ==
The soundtrack was released through Milan Records on December 17, 2021. A vinyl edition of the album was further issued on July 1, 2022, through Music on Vinyl.

== Reception ==
Mark Kermode of The Guardian wrote "A jazzy, dreamy score by Dickon Hinchliffe completes the picture, with the textures of a lost vinyl recording bridging the gap between the past, present and future." Ella Kemp of Empire called it "an elegant score by former Tindersticks member Dickon Hinchliffe" Peter Debruge of Variety called it a "moving score", while The Arts Fuse-based Peg Aloi deciphered it as a "dreamy score" juxtaposed the film. Pete Hammond of Deadline Hollywood wrote "special shout-out to the exceptional and vibrant musical score from Dickon Hinchliffe that really helps to define the ever-changing tones of the piece." Matt Mahler of MovieWeb described it a "catchy, romantic score".

David Rooney of The Hollywood Reporter wrote "counterintuitive use of Dickon Hinchliffe's jazzy music over scenes [convey] a disquieting edge". Tara Bennett of IGN called it as "gorgeous, jazzy, melodic score that is sultry, soaring, and playful. It represents the freest parts of Leda, her unfettered, inner self coming out to play." Zac Ntim of Business Insider wrote "A swooning, jazzy score by British composer Dickon Hinchliffe completes the film adding heavy sonic texture that allows Gyllenhaal's screenplay to move seamlessly between the past and the present."

== Track listing ==
No.	Title	Length
1.	"Leda"	2:14
2.	"Leda Swims"	1:06
3.	"Glass of Water"	1:57
4.	"Mina"	3:54
5.	"I'm Working"	0:53
6.	"Octopus"	2:16
7.	"Pine Cone"	1:12
8.	"Broken Glass"	4:19
9.	"The Offer"	1:23
10.	"The Affair"	3:47
11.	"Dance Party"	1:13
12.	"The Great Wings"	2:23
13.	"Playground"	1:59
14.	"Do You Need a Hand?"	1:50
15.	"Unnatural Mother"	2:52
16.	"Let Me Tell You All About It"	5:00
Total length:		38:18

== Release history ==
Release history and formats for The Lost Daughter (Soundtrack from the Netflix Film)
Region	Date	Format(s)	Label(s)	Ref.
Various	December 17, 2021	Digital download; streaming	Milan Records	
Various	July 1, 2022	LP	Music on Vinyl	

== Original songs ==
The Lost Daughter (Original Songs from the Netflix Film)

Studio album / soundtrack album by Monika Christodoulou
- Released: December 23, 2021
- Recorded: 2021
- Genre: Film soundtrack
- Length: 38:16
- Producer: Monika Christodoulou

Monika Christodoulou chronology
The garden is blooming - O Kipos Einai Anthiros (2019)	The Lost Daughter (2021)	PROUD (2023)

An album that contained the original songs for the film, written and performed by singer-songwriter Monika Christodoulou was released on December 23, 2021.

No.	Title	Length
1.	"Stala Instrumental"	3:54
2.	"Moiraia Ego Gynaika"	2:53
3.	"Salparoume Gia Spetses"	3:30
4.	"Ola Lathos"	3:07
5.	"Kapetanios"	2:46
6.	"Aima Mou"	2:58
7.	"Den Tha Xanartheis"	3:02
8.	"Honoloulou"	3:12
9.	"Den Thelo Tipota"	2:57
10.	"Ypothetika"	2:32
11.	"Stala"	3:32
12.	"Solo Bouzouki"	3:53
Total length:		38:16
