= List of awards and nominations received by Dakota Johnson =

Dakota Johnson awards and nominations
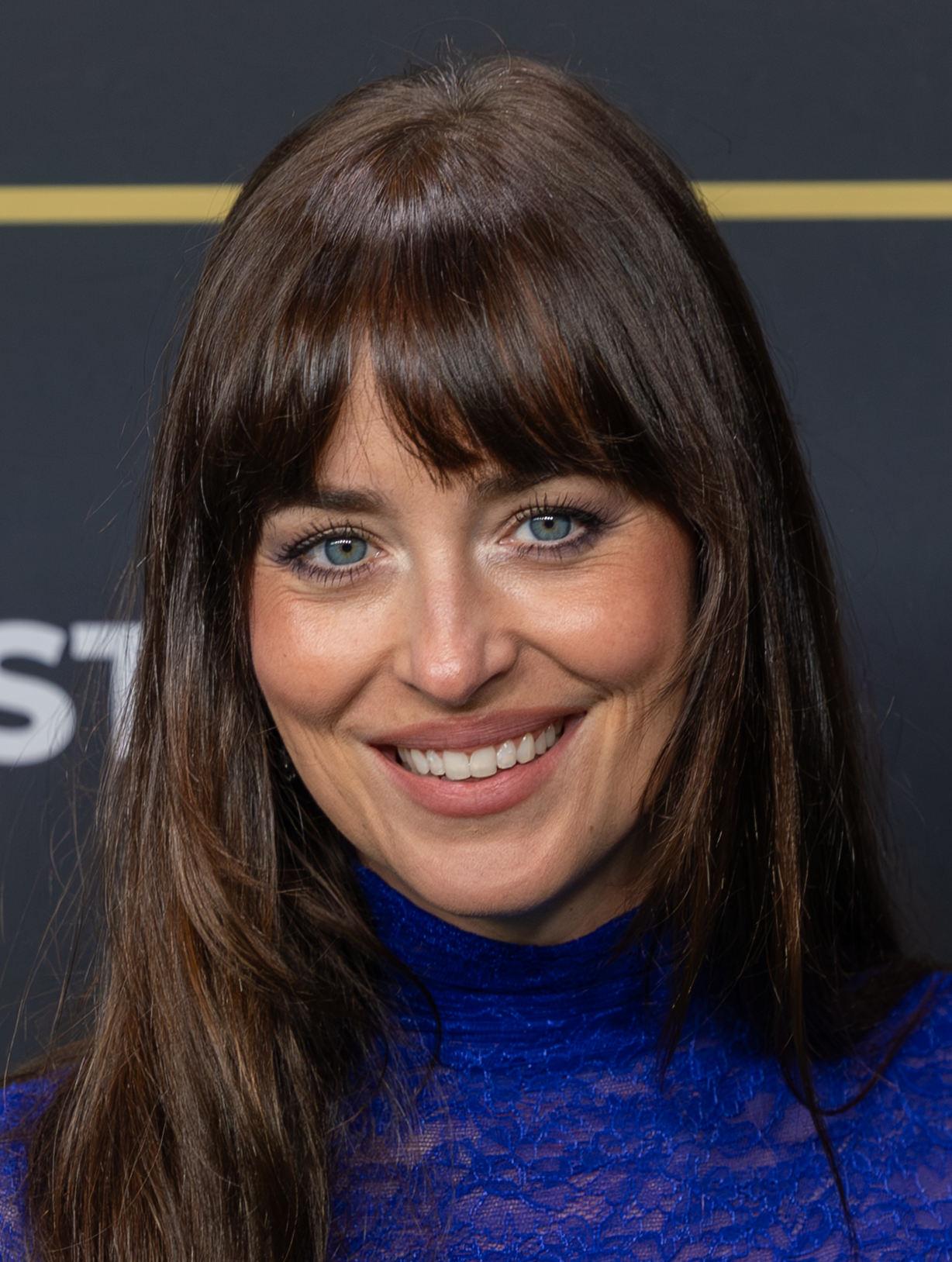
- Johnson in 2025
Awards and nominations
Award	Wins	Nominations
British Academy Film Awards	0	1
Independent Spirit Awards	1	2
MTV Movie & TV Awards	0	2
People's Choice Awards	1	1

Totals (Note: Certain award groups do not simply award one winner. They acknowledge several different recipients, have runners-up, and have third place. Since this is a specific recognition and is different from losing an award, runner-up mentions are considered wins in this award tally. For simplification and to avoid errors, each award in this list has been presumed to have had a prior nomination.)
- Wins: 10
- Nominations: 25

The following is a list of awards and nominations received by American actress and model Dakota Johnson. Among her accolades, she received the Robert Altman Award from the Independent Spirit Awards as a part of the ensemble for Suspiria. She also received a People's Choice Award, as well as nominations for two MTV Movie & TV Awards and the BAFTA Rising Star Award.

== Awards and nominations ==
Awards and nominations received by Dakota Johnson
Award	Year (Note: Indicates the year of ceremony)	Category	Nominated work	Result	Ref(s)
Alliance of Women Film Journalists Awards	2016	Actress Most in Need of a New Agent	Fifty Shades of Grey	Nominated	
Alliance of Women Film Journalists Awards	2018	Actress Most in Need of a New Agent	Fifty Shades Darker	Nominated	
Alliance of Women Film Journalists Awards	2019	Actress Most in Need of a New Agent	Fifty Shades Freed	Nominated	
British Academy Film Awards	2016	Rising Star Award	—N/a	Nominated	
CinemaCon Awards	2018	Female Star Of The Year	—N/a	Won	
Critics' Choice Documentary Awards	2023	Best Narration	The Disappearance of Shere Hite	Nominated	
Elle Women in Hollywood Awards	2015	Emerging Talent Award	—N/a	Won	
Golden Raspberry Awards	2016	Worst Actress	Fifty Shades of Grey	Won	
Golden Raspberry Awards	2016	Worst Screen Combo	Fifty Shades of Grey	Won (Note: Shared with Jamie Dornan)	
Golden Raspberry Awards	2018	Worst Actress	Fifty Shades Darker	Nominated	
Golden Raspberry Awards	2018	Worst Screen Combo	Fifty Shades Darker	Nominated	
Golden Raspberry Awards	2025	Worst Actress	Madame Web	Won	
Hollywood Creative Alliance (Midseason Awards)	2022	Best Supporting Actress	Cha Cha Real Smooth	Nominated	
Hollywood Film Awards	2010	Ensemble of the Year	The Social Network	Won (Note: Shared with rest of cast)	
Indiana Film Journalist' Association	2018	Best Actress	Suspiria	Nominated	
Indiana Film Journalist' Association	2022	Best Supporting Performance	Cha Cha Real Smooth	Nominated	
Independent Spirit Awards	2019	Robert Altman Award	Suspiria	Won	
Independent Spirit Awards	2024	Best New Scripted Series	Slip	Nominated	
Karlovy Vary International Film Festival	2025	Festival President’s Award		Honoured	
MTV Movie & TV Awards	2016	Best Breakthrough Performance	Fifty Shades of Grey	Nominated	
MTV Movie & TV Awards	2016	Best Kiss	Fifty Shades of Grey	Nominated	
Middleburg Film Festival	2021	Actor Spotlight Award	The Lost Daughter	Honored	
Palm Springs International Film Festival	2011	Ensemble Cast Award	The Social Network	Won	
People's Choice Awards	2016	Favorite Dramatic Movie Actress	Fifty Shades of Grey	Won	
San Diego Film Critics Society Awards	2010	Best Ensemble Performance	The Social Network	Nominated	
Washington D.C. Area Film Critics Association	2010	Best Acting Ensemble	The Social Network	Nominated	
Women's Image Network Awards	2013	Outstanding Actress in a Comedy Series	Ben and Kate	Nominated	
Women Film Critics Circle Awards	2015	Worst Female Image in a Movie	Fifty Shades of Grey	Nominated	
Women Film Critics Circle Awards	2024	Best Screen Couple	Daddio	Nominated (Note: Shared with Sean Penn)	
Young Hollywood Awards	2014	Breakthrough Actress	—N/a	Nominated	
Zurich Film Festival	2025	Golden Eye Award	Splitsville	Won	
