= Fifty Shades (film series) =

2015 to 2018 film series based on the novels by E. L. James

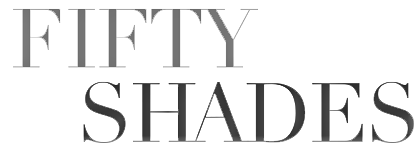
- Official film series logo
- Directed by: Sam Taylor-Johnson (1); James Foley (2–3)
- Screenplay by: Kelly Marcel (1); Niall Leonard (2–3)
- Based on: Fifty Shades trilogy by E. L. James
- Produced by: Michael De Luca; E. L. James; Dana Brunetti; Marcus Viscidi (2–3)
- Starring: Dakota Johnson; Jamie Dornan; (See below)
- Cinematography: Seamus McGarvey (1); John Schwartzman (2–3)
- Edited by: Anne V. Coates (1); Lisa Gunning (1); Debra Neil-Fisher (1, 3); Richard Francis-Bruce (2–3); David Clark (3)
- Music by: Danny Elfman
- Production companies: Michael De Luca Productions; Trigger Street Productions; Perfect World Pictures (2–3) (Note: Even though the company produced Fifty Shades Darker, their logo is not shown on any promotional material or in the movie itself.)
- Distributed by: Focus Features (1); Universal Pictures
- Release dates: February 13, 2015 (1); February 10, 2017 (2); February 9, 2018 (3)
- Running time: 348 minutes
- Country: United States
- Language: English
- Budget: Total (3 films): $150 million
- Box office: Total (3 films): $1.325 billion

Fifty Shades is a film trilogy based on the Fifty Shades trilogy by English author E. L. James. It is distributed by Universal Pictures, and stars Dakota Johnson and Jamie Dornan as the lead roles Anastasia Steele and Christian Grey, respectively. Sam Taylor-Johnson directed the first film, and James Foley directed the second and third films.

The first film, Fifty Shades of Grey, was released on February 13, 2015, while the second, Fifty Shades Darker, was released on February 10, 2017. Fifty Shades Freed, the third film, was released on February 9, 2018. Although the films were poorly received critically, the series grossed over $1.32 billion worldwide, making it the eighth highest-grossing R-rated franchise of all time.

== Development ==
Two years after the trilogy's first novel was released, several distribution companies had bid for the rights of the trilogy. Warner Bros., Sony, Paramount and Universal, as well as Mark Wahlberg's production company, put in bids for the film rights. The winning bid went to Universal Pictures and Focus Features, at $5 million. With James gaining control over the process of the making of the film, she hand-picked Dana Brunetti and Michael De Luca as the producers.

== Films ==
Film	U.S. release date	Director(s)	Screenwriter(s)	Producer(s)
Fifty Shades of Grey	February 13, 2015	Sam Taylor-Johnson	Kelly Marcel	E. L. James; Dana Brunetti; Michael De Luca
Fifty Shades Darker	February 10, 2017	James Foley	Niall Leonard	E. L. James; Dana Brunetti; Michael De Luca; Marcus Viscidi
Fifty Shades Freed	February 9, 2018	James Foley	Niall Leonard	E. L. James; Dana Brunetti; Michael De Luca; Marcus Viscidi

=== Fifty Shades of Grey (2015) ===
When Anastasia "Ana" Steele, a literature student, goes to interview the wealthy Christian Grey, as a favor to her roommate Kate Kavanagh, she encounters a handsome, brilliant and intimidating man. The innocent and naive Ana, startled to realize she wants him, despite his enigmatic reserve and advice, finds herself desperate to get close to him. Not able to resist Ana's beauty and independent spirit, Grey admits he wants her too, but on his own terms. Ana hesitates as she discovers the singular tastes of Grey; despite the embellishments of success – his multinational businesses, his vast wealth, his loving family – Grey is consumed by the need to control everything. As they get close, Steele starts to discover Grey's secrets and explores her own BDSM desires.

=== Fifty Shades Darker (2017) ===
Following the events of the first film, Anastasia Steele and Christian Grey resume their relationship under Ana's terms. However, their relationship is tested when Christian's past threatens the couple.

=== Fifty Shades Freed (2018) ===
Believing they have left behind the shadowy figures from the past, billionaire Christian Grey and his new wife, Anastasia, fully embrace their inextricable connection and shared life of luxury. Just as the Greys begin to step into their new roles, sinister events come to light and jeopardize their happy ending before it even begins.

== Cast and characters ==
List indicators

This section includes characters who will appear or have appeared in more than two films in the series.

- An empty grey cell indicates the character was not in the film, or that the character's official presence has not yet been confirmed.
- ^{A} indicates an appearance through archival footage or audio.
- ^{C} indicates a cameo role.
- ^{E} indicates an appearance not included in the theatrical cut.
- ^{O} indicates an older version of the character.
- ^{P} indicates an appearance in onscreen photographs.
- ^{U} indicates an uncredited appearance.
- ^{V} indicates a voice-only role.
- ^{Y} indicates a younger version of the character.

Character	Films		
Character	Fifty Shades of Grey	Fifty Shades Darker	Fifty Shades Freed
Character	2015	2017	2018
Anastasia "Ana" Steele-Grey	Dakota Johnson	Dakota Johnson	Dakota Johnson
Christian Grey	Jamie Dornan	Jamie Dornan	Jamie Dornan
Katherine "Kate" Kavanagh	Eloise Mumford	Eloise Mumford	Eloise Mumford
José Rodriguez Jr.	Victor Rasuk	Victor Rasuk	Victor Rasuk
Elliot Grey	Luke Grimes	Luke Grimes	Luke Grimes
Dr. Grace Trevelyan Grey	Marcia Gay Harden	Marcia Gay Harden	Marcia Gay Harden
Mia Grey	Rita Ora	Rita Ora	Rita Ora
Jason Taylor	Max Martini	Max Martini	Max Martini
Carrick Grey	Andrew Airlie	Andrew Airlie	Andrew Airlie
Carla May Wilks	Jennifer Ehle	Jennifer Ehle	Jennifer Ehle
Bob Adams	Dylan Neal	Dylan Neal	Dylan Neal
Raymond Steele	Callum Keith Rennie		Callum Keith Rennie
Jack Hyde		Eric Johnson	Eric Johnson
Jerry Roach		Bruce Altman	Bruce Altman
Ros Bailey		Robinne Lee	Robinne Lee
Elizabeth Morgan		Amy Price-Francis	Amy Price-Francis
Gail Jones		Fay Masterson	Fay Masterson
Elena Lincoln (Mrs. Robinson)		Kim Basinger	Kim Basinger^{U}^{E}
Leila Williams		Bella Heathcote	
Gia Matteo			Arielle Kebbel
Luke Sawyer			Brant Daugherty
Boyce Fox			Tyler Hoechlin

== Production ==
=== Directors ===
On June 19, 2013, Sam Taylor-Johnson was chosen to direct the first film. On February 6, 2015, Taylor-Johnson announced the sequels, prompting she would return to direct the sequels. It was later revealed that Taylor-Johnson would not return. On August 20, 2015, it was revealed by Deadline Hollywood that James Foley was the front-runner to direct the sequel and third film Fifty Shades Freed.

=== Screenwriters ===
Kelly Marcel was chosen as the screenwriter for the first film.

On April 22, 2015, it was announced that author E.L. James' husband, Niall Leonard, would write the script for the sequel. Leonard also went on to write the script for the third film.

=== Casting ===
The casting for the lead roles was considered controversial. Many contenders considered for the film included Ryan Gosling, Garrett Hedlund, Theo James, Alexander Skarsgård, François Arnaud, Charlie Hunnam, Scott Eastwood, Luke Bracey, Ian Somerhalder and Billy Magnussen as Christian Grey. Alicia Vikander, Imogen Poots, Elizabeth Olsen, Shailene Woodley, Alexis Bledel and Felicity Jones were all considered for the role of Anastasia Steele.

On September 2, 2013, Dakota Johnson and Charlie Hunnam were cast as Anastasia Steele and Christian Grey respectively. As a result, the displeasure of the casting from fans caused controversy. In response, Brunetti stated, "There is a lot that goes into casting that isn't just looks. Talent, availability, their desire to do it, chemistry with other actor, etc. So if your favorite wasn't cast, then it is most likely due to something on that list. Keep that in mind while hating and keep perspective." On October 12, it was announced Hunnam had quit the role of Grey and the studio was in the process of searching for a new actor. On October 23, Jamie Dornan was cast as the replacement for Christian Grey.

In October 2013, Jennifer Ehle was cast as Carla Wilks. On October 31, 2013, Victor Rasuk was cast as José Rodriguez Jr. On November 22, 2013, Eloise Mumford was cast as Kate Kavanagh. On December 2, 2013, singer Rita Ora was cast as Christian's younger sister Mia. On December 3, 2013, Marcia Gay Harden was cast as Christian's mother, Grace.

On January 28, 2016, Kim Basinger joined the franchise to play the role of Elena Lincoln in the sequels, Grey's business partner and former lover, while Luke Grimes, Eloise Mumford and Max Martini would be returning for the sequels. On February 5, Bella Heathcote was cast as Leila, one of Grey's former submissives. In the same month, Eric Johnson was cast to play Jack Hyde, Ana's boss at SIP. On February 18, 2016, Robinne Lee and Fay Masterson joined the film's cast. On February 20, Brant Daugherty signed on to play Luke Sawyer, the personal bodyguard for Anastasia in the third film.

=== Filming ===
For Fifty Shades of Grey, principal photography was filmed in Vancouver, British Columbia, Canada, which began on December 1, 2013. Scenes were filmed in the Gastown district of Vancouver. Bentall 5 was used as the Grey Enterprises building. The University of British Columbia serves as Washington State University Vancouver, from which Ana graduates. The Fairmont Hotel Vancouver was used as the Heathman Hotel. The film was also shot at the North Shore Studios. The production officially ended on February 21, 2014. Reshoots involving scenes between Dornan and Johnson took place in Vancouver during the week of October 13, 2014.

For Fifty Shades Darker and Fifty Shades Freed, principal photography was to commence in June in Vancouver, British Columbia, Canada. This was later to be impossible, due to the script being unwritten at that moment. In November 2015, Warner Bros. announced that both films would be shot back-to-back with principal photography scheduled to commence in early 2016. Filming began in Paris and Vancouver from February 9, 2016, to July 12, 2016, under the working title "Further Adventures of Max and Banks 2 & 3." Filming on Fifty Shades Darker concluded on April 11, 2016.

== Reception ==
With a combined worldwide gross over $1.3 billion, the franchise was one of the biggest R-rated franchises ever, behind only The Matrix ($1.6 billion over three films), The Hangover ($1.4 billion over three films) and Alien ($1.328 billion not counting the PG-13 Alien vs. Predator).

=== Box office performance ===
Film	Release date	Box office gross				Budget	Reference
Film	Release date	Opening weekend (North America)	North America	Other territories	Worldwide	Budget	Reference
Fifty Shades of Grey	February 13, 2015	$85,171,450	$166,167,230	$404,838,898	$569,651,467	$40 million	
Fifty Shades Darker	February 10, 2017	$46,607,250	$114,581,250	$266,962,186	$381,543,436	$55 million	
Fifty Shades Freed	February 9, 2018	$38,560,195	$100,407,760	$271,501,689	$371,909,449	$55 million	
Total			$381,156,240	$943,302,773	$1,323,104,352	$150 million	

=== Critical and public response ===
Critical and public response of Fifty Shades
Film	Critical		Public
Film	Rotten Tomatoes	Metacritic	CinemaScore
Fifty Shades of Grey	25% (280 reviews)	46 (46 reviews)	C+
Fifty Shades Darker	11% (208 reviews)	33 (39 reviews)	B+
Fifty Shades Freed	11% (193 reviews)	31 (43 reviews)	B+

=== Accolades ===
Fifty Shades of Grey
Award	Category	Recipients	Result	Ref.
Academy Awards	Best Original Song	Belly, Stephan Moccio, Jason Quenneville, and The Weeknd for "Earned It"	Nominated	
Brit Awards	British Single of the Year	Ellie Goulding for "Love Me like You Do"	Nominated	
Critics' Choice Awards	Best Song	"Love Me like You Do"	Nominated	
Golden Globe Awards	Best Original Song	Savan Kotecha, Max Martin, Tove Lo, Ali Payami and Ilya Salmanzadeh for "Love Me like You Do"	Nominated	
Golden Raspberry Awards	Worst Picture	Michael De Luca, Dana Brunetti, E. L. James	Won	
Golden Raspberry Awards	Worst Director	Sam Taylor-Johnson	Nominated	
Golden Raspberry Awards	Worst Actor	Jamie Dornan	Won	
Golden Raspberry Awards	Worst Actress	Dakota Johnson	Won	
Golden Raspberry Awards	Worst Screen Combo	Jamie Dornan and Dakota Johnson	Won	
Golden Raspberry Awards	Worst Screenplay	Kelly Marcel	Won	
Grammy Awards	Best Compilation Soundtrack for Visual Media	Fifty Shades of Grey: Original Motion Picture Soundtrack	Nominated	
Grammy Awards	Best Song Written for Visual Media	Savan Kotecha, Max Martin, Tove Lo, Ali Payami and Ilya Salmanzadeh for "Love Me like You Do"	Nominated	
Grammy Awards	Best Song Written for Visual Media	Ahmad Balshe, Stephan Moccio, Jason Queenneville and Abel Tesfaye for "Earned It"	Nominated	
Grammy Awards	Best R&B Song	Ahmad Balshe, Stephan Moccio, Jason Queenneville and Abel Tesfaye for "Earned It"	Nominated	
Grammy Awards	Best Pop Solo Performance	Ellie Goulding for "Love Me like You Do"	Nominated	
Grammy Awards	Best R&B Performance	The Weeknd for "Earned It"	Won	
MTV Movie Awards	Breakthrough Performance	Dakota Johnson	Nominated	
MTV Movie Awards	Best Kiss	Jamie Dornan and Dakota Johnson	Nominated	
People's Choice Awards	Favorite Dramatic Movie	Fifty Shades of Grey	Nominated	
Satellite Awards	Best Original Song	"Love Me like You Do"	Nominated	
Fifty Shades Darker
Golden Raspberry Awards	Worst Picture	Michael De Luca, Dana Brunetti, E. L. James, Marcus Viscidi	Nominated	
Golden Raspberry Awards	Worst Prequel, Remake, Rip-off or Sequel	Fifty Shades Darker	Won	
Golden Raspberry Awards	Worst Director	James Foley	Nominated	
Golden Raspberry Awards	Worst Actor	Jamie Dornan	Nominated	
Golden Raspberry Awards	Worst Actress	Dakota Johnson	Nominated	
Golden Raspberry Awards	Worst Supporting Actress	Kim Basinger	Won	
Golden Raspberry Awards	Worst Screen Combo	Any combination of two characters, two sex toys or two sexual positions	Nominated	
Golden Raspberry Awards	Worst Screenplay	Niall Leonard	Nominated	
Golden Trailer Awards	Best Romance TV Spot	Universal Pictures, Trailer Park	Nominated	
Grammy Awards	Best Song Written for Visual Media	Jack Antonoff, Sam Dew & Taylor Swift for "I Don't Wanna Live Forever"	Nominated	
Satellite Awards	Best Original Song	"I Don't Wanna Live Forever"	Nominated	
Fifty Shades Freed
Golden Raspberry Awards
Golden Raspberry Awards	Worst Director	James Foley	Nominated	
Golden Raspberry Awards	Worst Supporting Actress	Marcia Gay Harden	Nominated	
Golden Raspberry Awards	Worst Screenplay	Niall Leonard	Won	
People's Choice Awards
People's Choice Awards	Favorite Movie	Fifty Shades Freed	Nominated	
People's Choice Awards	Favorite Drama Movie	Fifty Shades Freed	Won	
People's Choice Awards	Favorite Drama Movie Star	Jamie Dornan	Won	
