= Dakota Johnson's interview on The Ellen DeGeneres Show =

2019 Internet meme from The Ellen DeGeneres Show

External videos
- YouTube videos
- Dakota Johnson Interview - Ellen Degeneres Show (2019) Season 17, Episode 58

In November 2019, American actress Dakota Johnson appeared on The Ellen DeGeneres Show. During her interview with American comedian Ellen DeGeneres, the host asked Johnson about not receiving an invitation to Johnson's then-recent 30th birthday party. Johnson asserted that she had invited her and encouraged DeGeneres to consult her staff, who ultimately confirmed that she had been invited but was unavailable at the time.

After the episode aired and the interview was uploaded to the talk show's YouTube channel, the exchange—particularly Johnson's response, "That's not the truth, Ellen"—circulated widely on social media and became a viral Internet meme. It was initially received largely as an awkward but humorous interaction between host and guest, with viewers noting the apparent tension and Johnson's blunt correction of DeGeneres. Media outlets also speculated that DeGeneres had missed Johnson's party to attend a football game with former United States president George W. Bush, which renewed attention to a controversy DeGeneres had previously addressed on her show.

In 2020, the exchange was reexamined following allegations of a toxic workplace environment at The Ellen DeGeneres Show. In the wake of DeGeneres's decision to end the show in 2022 and further allegations of unkind behavior, the interview was reassessed by commentators, some of whom described it as an inciting incident in the decline of her public image. Some publications have ranked the interview as one of the most memorable moments in talk show history, and it has since become associated with Johnson's public persona.

== Background ==
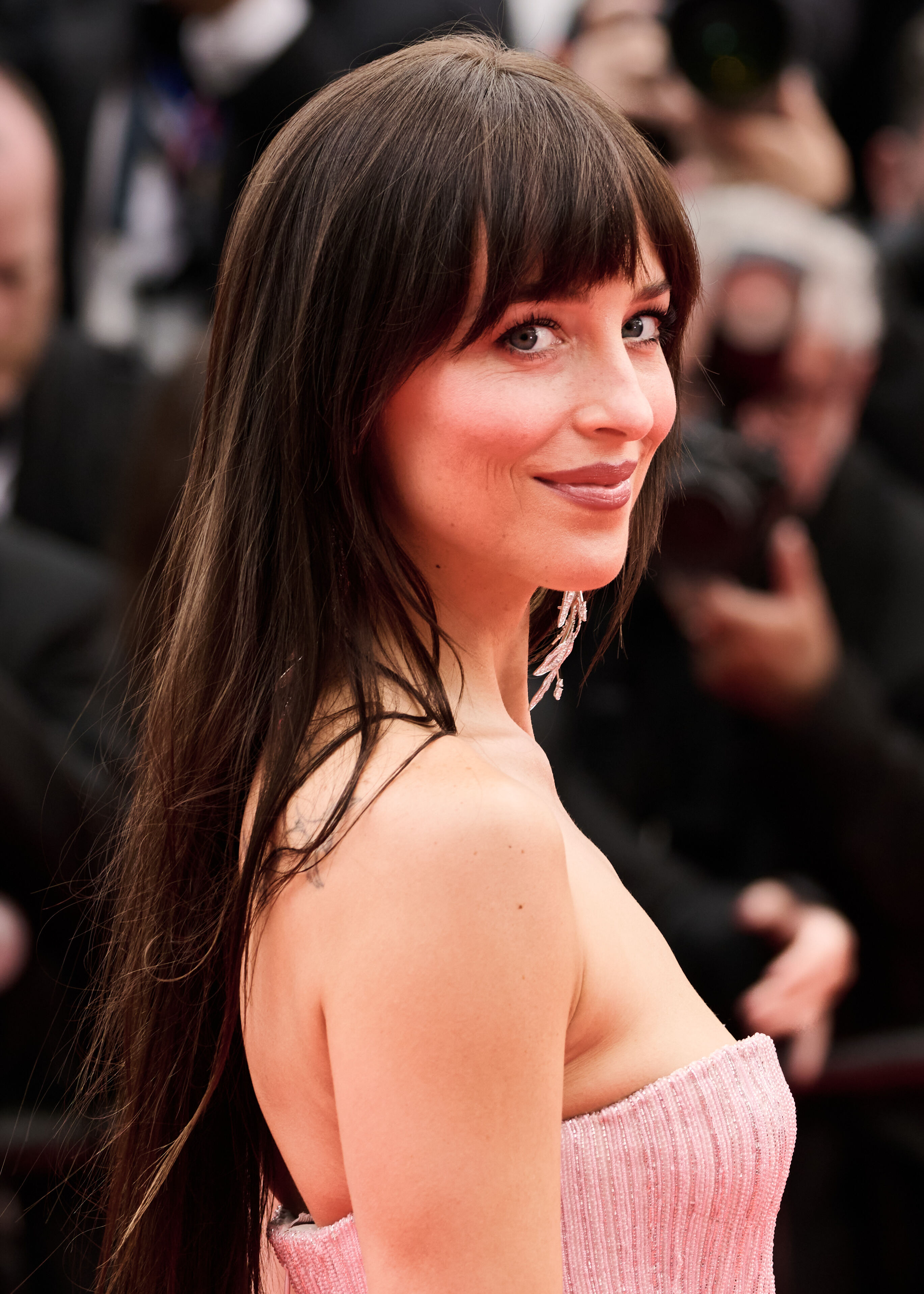
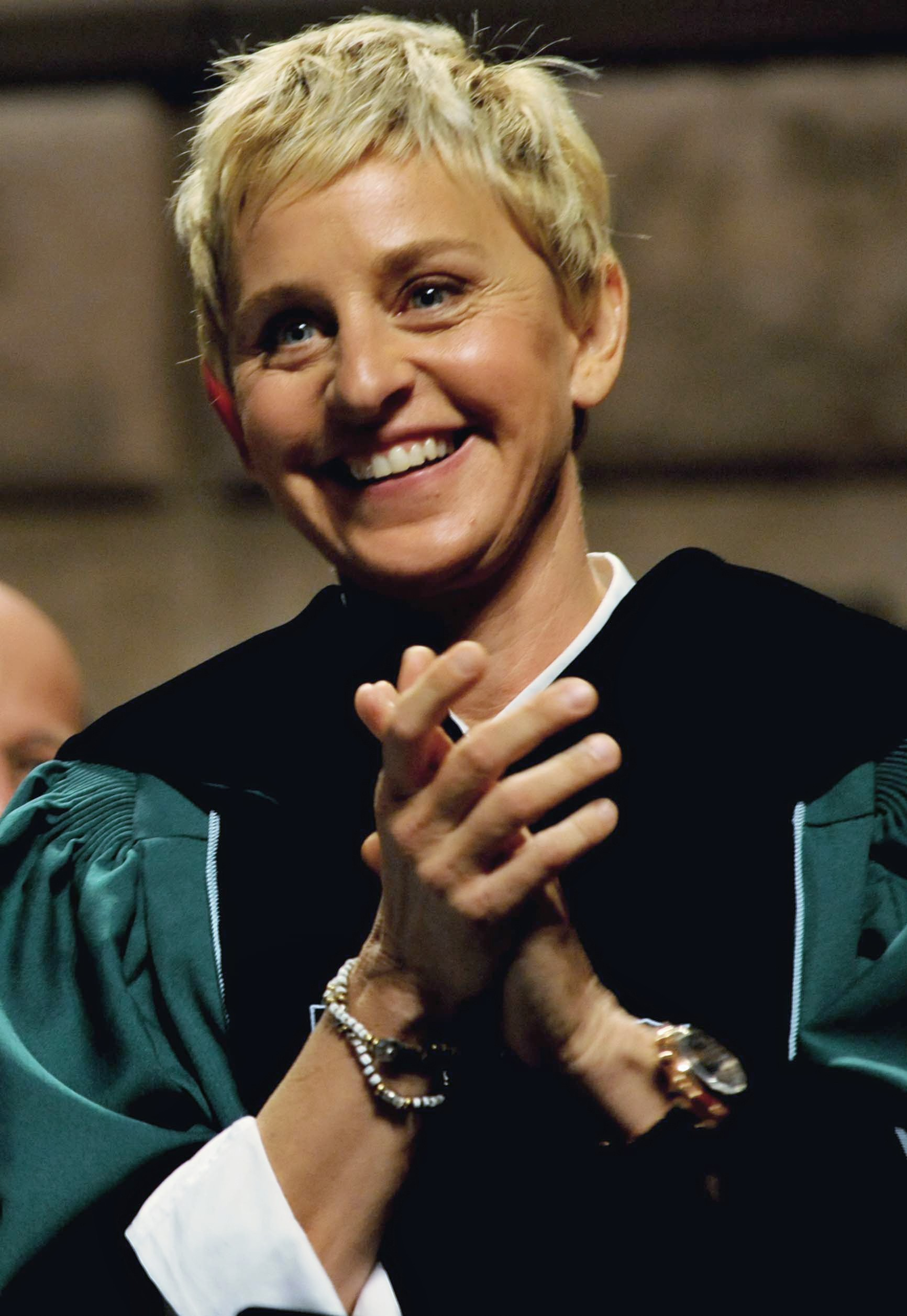
Actress Dakota Johnson (left) and comedian Ellen DeGeneres (right), who hosted The Ellen DeGeneres Show from 2003 to 2022.

In November 2019, (Note: The Ellen DeGeneres Show typically taped episodes a few days in advance of their broadcast date.) actress Dakota Johnson appeared on The Ellen DeGeneres Show to promote her film The Peanut Butter Falcon (2019). After wishing Johnson a belated 30th birthday, host Ellen DeGeneres asked her how her birthday party was, claiming that she had not been invited to the event. While the studio audience laughed, Johnson responded, "Actually, no, that's not the truth, Ellen. You were invited", and clarified that DeGeneres had simply not attended. Additionally, Johnson noted that DeGeneres had previously remarked on being excluded from her birthday party the year prior, (Note: Referring to Johnson's October 2018 interview on The Ellen DeGeneres Show.) and therefore ensured she was invited on this occasion. She also stated that she was unsure whether the talk show host liked her in the first place, despite having previously appeared on the show several times.

When DeGeneres continued to express skepticism about the invitation, Johnson encouraged her to "ask everybody", referring to the show's staff, and specifically Jonathan Norman, one of its producers. DeGeneres addressed an off-camera crew member, who confirmed that she had in fact been invited but was "out of town" at the time. (Note: A crew member responded from off-camera; some sources suggest the individual was producer Jonathan Norman, whom Johnson had named during the exchange.) DeGeneres quickly acknowledged that she "had that thing", and then said that Malibu, California, where she assumed Johnson had hosted the party, would have been too far for her to travel at the time. DeGeneres conceded, thanking Johnson for the invitation, and stating that she had not remembered until that moment.

The interview continued with further exchanges referencing Johnson's birthday party, including discussing comedian Tig Notaro's performance at the event. Johnson referred to Notaro as her "favourite comedian", before adding "other than [DeGeneres]"; DeGeneres joked about Jennifer Aniston being her "favourite actress" in return. Johnson pretended to walk away from the interview before returning to her seat. DeGeneres also claimed that she had introduced Johnson to Notaro at her 60th birthday party, which Johnson disputed, noting that she had already left before Notaro's performance began. The conversation later shifted briefly to Johnson's relationship with musician Chris Martin, which she addressed minimally, before the remainder of the segment finally focused on her film.

== Reception and virality ==
The episode featuring Johnson's interview aired on November 27, 2019. Most initial reactions described the interview as an awkward but overall humorous exchange between the actress and talk show host. Some commentators praised Johnson's nonchalance and bluntness, which Christopher Rosa of Glamour and Erin Nyren of Variety noted had already become trademarks of Johnson's public appearances prior to Ellen. Devika Desai of the National Post reported that, at the time, fans "hailed Johnson for being one of the few celebrities to call out the host in a lie", and Georgia Aspinall of Grazia said the actress gave "us the most hilarious example of passive-aggressive behaviour we've ever seen". Others noted that Johnson's remarks appeared to unsettle the typically relaxed and composed DeGeneres, in a manner that few guests had previously done. Body language expert Blanca Cobb analyzed the interaction and stated that DeGeneres's expressions and behavior suggested discomfort and defensiveness, while Johnson's indicated relative ease, sincerity, and candor. Adam White of The Daily Telegraph reported that "thousands [took] pride in her being gently taken down a notch in her own TV home", and some critics argued that DeGeneres had treated Johnson unfairly by attempting to address a private situation on-air. However, Tara Watson of Mamamia attributed much of the interview's awkwardness to Johnson, arguing that DeGeneres was attempting to keep the conversation moving.

Some media outlets and viewers speculated that DeGeneres's absence from Johnson's party was due to her attending a Dallas Cowboys vs. Green Bay Packers football game, where she had been photographed seated with former U.S. president George W. Bush. The images prompted criticism from some fans, who objected to DeGeneres socializing with Bush due to his conservative political views during his presidency, including positions opposing certain LGBTQ rights. Although DeGeneres's whereabouts the day of Johnson's party were never publicly disclosed, reports confirmed that Johnson's party and the game took place the same weekend in October 2019, in California and Texas, respectively. Although DeGeneres had already addressed the controversy and defended her friendship with Bush on an episode of her talk show that had preceded Johnson's, the interview brought renewed attention to the incident. Ellen Gutoskey of Salon suggested that the exchange likely would have faded into obscurity had the Internet not used it to fuel discussions about the Bush incident.

On November 27, 2019, the show's YouTube channel, TheEllenShow, uploaded a clip of Johnson's interview, titled "Dakota Johnson's Favorite Comedian Isn't Ellen". The video received over 2.7 million views and 27,000 likes within five days. The segment was widely shared on social media, inspiring countless Internet memes and GIFs. The clip itself became viral, and was circulated on YouTube and news programs. By 2022, the original YouTube video had accumulated 8 million views, and 10 million by 2024. Vox writer Alex Abad-Santos attributed its virality to DeGeneres having repeatedly discussed not being invited to Johnson's party, only to be contradicted on-air, as well as to the sense of wish fulfillment and satisfaction it offered viewers who had experienced similar situations in their own lives. He also suggested that the clip's virality was shaped in part by DeGeneres's public persona, arguing that the exchange might not have attracted the same attention had it involved a public figure less associated with honesty and kindness. As a meme, images of Johnson are typically used to signal having proven oneself right in a conversation or to indicate an awkward moment.

== Impact ==
In July 2020, some employees of The Ellen DeGeneres Show publicly accused the show of fostering a toxic work environment. While most blamed senior management and not DeGeneres herself, some said she bore some responsibility as the show's host and namesake. The allegations prompted an internal investigation and dismissal of three senior producers. In September 2020, DeGeneres addressed the allegations, apologizing while stating she had not been aware of the incidents prior to the investigation. The controversy contributed to increased media scrutiny regarding DeGeneres's public image, particularly her long-standing brand promoting kindness and relatability. By November 2020, viewers had begun celebrating the "anniversary" of Johnson's interview on social media, with Paloma Rando of Vanity Fair España naming it "one of the most widespread memes of recent months". By 2021, Johnson's quotes from the interview had become "a staple of internet-speak", according to Maria Loreto of ¡Hola!

In May 2021, DeGeneres announced that her talk show would end the following year, after its 19th season. She denied speculation that the decision was a direct result of the allegations. Following the announcement, the Johnson interview resurfaced in online discussions about the show, with social media posts jokingly reframing the exchange as symbolically responsible for its subsequent controversies and eventual ending. Rachel Brodsky of The Independent corroborated that, historically, the meme resurfaces when there is unfavorable news involving DeGeneres. Twitter users frequently shared excerpts from DeGeneres's press interviews about deciding to end the show with stills from her interview with Johnson. Andi Ortiz of TheWrap noted that the meme came to be used as a way for viewers to express skepticism about the reasons DeGeneres provided for the show's conclusion. (Note: Publicly, DeGeneres cited no longer feeling creatively challenged by her talk show as the reason for its ending.) The exchange prompted renewed discussions on Twitter, where both viewers and celebrities shared their own accounts of negative experiences with DeGeneres, and reexamined past Ellen interviews for evidence of awkward or unkind behavior toward guests. Alex Abad-Santos of Vox wrote that while the interview initially prompted a semi-playful examination of whether DeGeneres was actually a nice person, it later became tied to more serious reports of a toxic work environment. In retrospect, the interview has been described in media and online discourse as "the beginning of the end" for The Ellen DeGeneres Show.

Some journalists have reassessed Johnson's Ellen interview as an inciting incident in the decline of the comedian's public image. While reporting on the 2020 allegations, Alex Abad-Santos of Vox labeled it "a pivotal moment in the dismantling of DeGeneres's persona as TV's friendliest talk show host", writing that the perception that she had been untruthful on-air was more damaging to her reputation than some earlier controversies. For The Washington Post, Kevin T. Porter observed that viewers were less willing to forgive DeGeneres for the Johnson interview than for the Bush controversy, the former of which he argued was less easily recontextualized as an act of kindness and instead became a "rebuke of the whole Ellen ethos". Adam White of The Daily Telegraph said the interview exposed a "groundswell of internet animosity felt towards DeGeneres". For The New York Times, Amil Niazi agreed that "The glee with which the clip was shared and embraced ... says a lot about how dramatically Ms. DeGeneres's relatability has turned to phoniness for some". Mel Woods of Xtra Magazine called the exchange "emblematic of the cultural conversation around the talk show host in recent years". Matt Brennan of the Los Angeles Times theorized that Johnson's seemingly innocuous response reinforced growing suspicions about DeGeneres's authenticity, inadvertently revealing "that stars are not at all like us".

According to Jodi Walker of The Ringer, public opinion on whether Johnson's humor "took down a daytime talk show empire" varies, with scholar Pilar G. Blitvich arguing that DeGeneres's "cancellation" is more nuanced than Johnson's fans have implied. Jenna Amatulli of HuffPost dismissed claims of Johnson's involvement as conjecture. Laura Bradley of The Daily Beast and Tara Watson of Mamamia agreed that DeGeneres was more responsible for damaging her own brand than Johnson, with Watson suggesting that the interview was less a cause of the backlash than a moment that coincided with growing criticism of DeGeneres. Robert Lloyd of the Los Angeles Times reported that viewers did not abandon the show over her exchange with Johnson. Peter C. Baker of The New York times argued that the interview "wasn't nearly as vicious or confrontational as people clearly wanted it to be, or as it has been portrayed in the many, many articles memorializing it". Walker concluded that, rather than being directly responsible for the end of The Ellen DeGeneres Show, Johnson "exposed that Ellen's sunny way of teasing people was often at the expense of those people—sometimes in the form of lying". DeGeneres never addressed the clip.

== Legacy ==
Some publications have described the interview as one of the most impactful moments in talk show history, with the staff of Elle Australia calling it one of television's most influential moments. Mel Woods of Xtra Magazine called Johnson's response "No, that's not the truth Ellen" an "iconic moment of television history". Salon considers the interview one of the 20 most memorable talk show moments, ranking it 11th. Men's Health ranked it the most awkward moment in talk show history. Gigwise named it the most embarrassing celebrity incident. It has also been cited as one of the most awkward yet memorable moments from The Ellen DeGeneres Show. Patrick Kelleher of PinkNews called the interview "television gold" despite its awkwardness and "without doubt one of the all-time most iconic moments from The Ellen DeGeneres Show". The phrase "That's not the truth, Ellen" has appeared on T-shirts and posters, and was added to the Know Your Meme website. According to Tara Watson of Mamamia, "That's not the truth, Ellen" remains "one of the most quoted celebrity phrases of all time", and Jason Adams of Mashable said few "words in recent memory been more deserving of their own monument". Emma Nolan of Newsweek said the quote has been immortalized on social media through the sheer volume of gifs and memes.

The interview has had a lasting impact on Johnson's public persona, shaping her reputation in the media. Johnson herself has rarely commented on or referenced the interview, but acknowledged in 2024 that it "haunts" her. Journalist Marisa Meltzer identified the interview as one of the defining factors that helped establish Johnson's public persona as "the Queen of Sarcasm", and Samantha Vincent of NBC said "That's not the truth, Ellen" embodies the dry humor for which she has become known. In 2022, Emma Specter of Vogue credited the actress with creating the "meme to end all memes". Betches ranked it first on their ranking of "Dakota Johnson's Most Unserious Interviews". In a timeline of the actress's notable media appearances, Bethy Squires of Vulture described the interview as the moment she "helped topple a daytime TV empire". The outfit Johnson wore in the interview, a tweed Alessandra Rich black-and-red plaid long-sleeve skirt suit, has also been described as memorable or iconic. In October 2021, actress Drew Barrymore referenced the interaction on her talk show, The Drew Barrymore Show, while interviewing Johnson, and commended Johnson's handling of the moment. According to Soaliha Iqbal of Pedestrian, the interview is likely what Johnson is best known for among Generation Z audiences. In 2024, several journalists compared Johnson's demeanor during the press tour for Madame Web (2024) to her appearance on The Ellen DeGeneres Show.

Notaro, whose performance at Johnson's party was discussed during the Ellen interview, eventually cast the actress in her directorial debut, the film Am I OK? (2022). Media outlets have noted Johnson's reputation for challenging talk show hosts, comparing the DeGeneres interview to a 2018 appearance on The Tonight Show Starring Jimmy Fallon, during which she confronted host Jimmy Fallon for interrupting her while she was answering a question. The interview resurfaced when The Tonight Show faced its own toxic workplace allegations in 2023, prompting Sophie Lloyd of Newsweek to dub Johnson the "queen of ending talk show careers".
