= Secret in the Dark =

Studio album by Monika
- Released: October 2, 2015
- Recorded: Dunham Sound Studios, Brooklyn
- Genre: Pop, Rock
- Length: 42:45
- Label: Other Music Recording Co.
- Producer: Homer Steinweiss

Monika chronology
Exit (2010)	Secret in the Dark (2015)

Secret in the Dark is a studio album by Monika Christodoulou, released under the performing name Monika. It was released in Europe and the United States on October 2, 2015 on the Other Music Recording Co. label.

== Background ==
Christodoulou had previously released two albums of folk-pop songs influenced by traditional Greek folk music. These records had made her a big star in her native Greece, both albums achieving platinum sales status there; French magazine Télérama has described her as the star of Greek pop music during the years of the country's financial crisis. She remained, however, largely unknown outside the country.

She has said, "My first two releases were pretty much just ballads. I was known in Greece for my deep, emotional side." Secret in the Dark represents a departure, both musically and lyrically, replacing the earlier, predominantly acoustic instrumentation with a mixture of upbeat disco, funk, and soul. In interviews, Christodoulou has repeatedly explained the change in musical style by recounting the story of an incident in which she nearly drowned. While on a sailing trip in the Aegean Sea in 2012, Christodoulou had to jump overboard after the boat caught fire; she swam for nearly eight hours to reach the shore, swimming in the dark and with no food or water. In the days afterwards, she temporarily lost her eyesight from over-exposure to salt water. Describing how the incident changed her perspective on her music, Christodoulou has said: "My first two albums, everyone was like, 'You’re such a positive person, why do you play this sad music?' I was like, maybe because it balances my ego. But now? No. Even at home, I just want to be grooving."

== Production ==
The record is produced by Homer Steinweiss, drummer with the Dap-Kings and a founder member of the Menahan Street Band. It also features Steinweiss's bandmate Thomas Brenneck on guitar. The pair had previously worked together on other Dap-Kings-related projects, notably Amy Winehouse's Back to Black (2006). Christodoulou met her collaborators when she was travelling in New York as a tourist. She presented herself at the office of Daptone Records where she met Brenneck, who listened to the demo recordings Christodolou had stored on her phone. She later returned to New York to work on the album.

== Reception ==
Professional ratings
Review scores
Source	Rating
AllMusic	4/5 stars
The Guardian	3/5 stars
Les Inrocks	4.5/5 stars

The reviewer for The Guardian writes that the record "attempts to stuff the irrepressible energies of disco, funk and soul into one package. When it works, as on Stripping’s icy disco-funk, Monika shines." AllMusic's reviewer writes that Monika's "pairing with Homer Steinweiss, Thomas Brenneck, and their cohorts on Secret in the Dark is inspired, taking her music in new and exciting directions." The reviewer adds: "The album also feels indebted to Monika's theatrical work; in the best possible way, its nighttime portraits and stories feel more like set pieces than mere songs." A review of the album's title track for Pitchfork states: "The deep clavinet groove runs on the DNA of Stevie Wonder’s “Superstition”, and gives way to luscious, loopy disco and Parallel Lines-era Blondie wooziness—a stylish amble through late 70s New York nightlife, essentially. But there’s still something unmistakably European about the track’s kitschy sensibility: “Secret” has a strong foothold in Euro-disco’s lineage, from Germany’s Veronika Fischer to ABBA." The French magazine Télérama named the record as one of their fifty best albums of 2015.

== Track listing ==
All tracks are written by Christodoulou and Steinweiss except where noted

No.	Title	Length
1.	"Intro"	1:10
2.	"Babyboy" (Christodoulou)	3:11
3.	"Shake Your Hands (feat. Andrew Wyatt)" (Christodoulou, Movshon, Steinweiss)	4:06
4.	"Secret in the Dark"	3:54
5.	"One More"	3:28
6.	"Lonely World"	3:29
7.	"We Came Into This World (To Beat Them)"	3:54
8.	"Give Us Wings"	2:04
9.	"Stripping"	4:23
10.	"Take Me with You" (Christodoulou)	5:06
11.	"Get Off My Way"	3:52
12.	"Gave You My Soul"	4:08
Total length:		42:45
