= The Lost Daughter (film) =

2021 film by Maggie Gyllenhaal

- Promotional release poster
- Directed by: Maggie Gyllenhaal
- Screenplay by: Maggie Gyllenhaal
- Based on: The Lost Daughter by Elena Ferrante
- Produced by: Charles Dorfman; Maggie Gyllenhaal; Osnat Handelsman-Keren; Talia Kleinhendler
- Starring: Olivia Colman; Dakota Johnson; Jessie Buckley; Paul Mescal; Dagmara Domińczyk; Jack Farthing; Oliver Jackson-Cohen; Peter Sarsgaard; Ed Harris
- Cinematography: Hélène Louvart
- Edited by: Affonso Gonçalves
- Music by: Dickon Hinchliffe
- Production companies: Endeavor Content; Pie Films; Samuel Marshall Productions; In the Current; Faliro House Productions
- Distributed by: Netflix (United States); Spentzos Films (Greece)
- Release dates: September 3, 2021 (Venice); December 17, 2021 (United States); December 31, 2021 (Netflix)
- Running time: 121 minutes
- Countries: Greece; United States
- Language: English
- Budget: $5 million
- Box office: $703,281

The Lost Daughter is a 2021 psychological drama film written and directed by Maggie Gyllenhaal (in her feature directorial debut), based on the 2006 novel by Elena Ferrante. The film stars Olivia Colman, Dakota Johnson, Jessie Buckley, Paul Mescal, Dagmara Domińczyk, Jack Farthing, Oliver Jackson-Cohen, Peter Sarsgaard, and Ed Harris. Colman also was an executive producer.

The Lost Daughter had its world premiere at the 78th Venice International Film Festival on September 3, 2021, where Gyllenhaal won the Best Screenplay award, and began a limited theatrical release in the United States on December 17, prior to streaming on December 31 on Netflix. The film was acclaimed by critics, and at the 94th Academy Awards received three nominations: Best Actress (Colman), Best Supporting Actress (Buckley), and Best Adapted Screenplay.

== Plot ==
While on holiday in Greece, middle-aged university professor and noted translator Leda Caruso meets Nina, a young mother, after Leda reunites Nina with her three-year-old daughter Elena, who has momentarily gone missing on the beach. Leda and Nina start talking, and Nina expresses her growing exhaustion and unhappiness.

Elena is upset after she loses her favorite doll, which Leda has secretly taken. In flashbacks, it is shown that Leda also struggled with being a young mother to her two daughters, Bianca and Martha, often losing her patience and becoming withdrawn from her family.

One evening Leda has dinner with Lyle, her holiday apartment's caretaker; he notices Leda has Elena's missing doll but doesn't comment on it, nor does he tell Nina. Leda later discovers Nina is having an affair with Will, who works at the beach bar; separately, Nina shares that her husband Toni is very controlling. The search for Elena's doll continues, with Nina even putting up flyers offering a reward for its return.

At a market, Leda buys Nina a hatpin to help hold her sunhat in place. When Nina asks Leda about her daughters, Leda becomes emotional; she reveals that she had abandoned them with her now ex-husband for three years after she became too overwhelmed, during which time she had an affair with a fellow professor. She admits being away from her daughters felt "amazing", and she only went back to them when she genuinely missed them. Nina learns that Leda knows about her and Will, and he later asks Leda if they can borrow her apartment to have sex.

When Nina arrives at Leda's to get the apartment keys the following day, Leda admits to being a selfish and "unnatural" mother and warns that Nina's depression will never go. She then gives Nina Elena's doll, confessing that she took it and that she was "just playing". Nina reacts angrily by stabbing Leda in the stomach with the hatpin before leaving. That night, Leda packs her bags and leaves the resort, but her stomach injury causes her to drive her car off the road; she soon collapses on the shoreline.

The next morning, Leda awakens and calls Bianca, who happens to be with Martha. They express their relief to hear from their mother, from whom they had not heard in several days. Leda says she is fine and then looks down to discover an orange in her hands; she peels the orange skin off "like a snake", the way she had done for her daughters when they were little.

== Cast ==
- Olivia Colman as Leda Caruso
  - Jessie Buckley as young Leda
- Dakota Johnson as Nina
- Ed Harris as Lyle
- Dagmara Domińczyk as Callisto "Callie"
- Paul Mescal as Will
- Robyn Elwell as Bianca
  - Ellie James as older Bianca (voice)
- Ellie Blake as Martha
  - Isabelle Della-Porta as older Martha (voice)
- Peter Sarsgaard as Professor Hardy
- Jack Farthing as Joe
- Oliver Jackson-Cohen as Toni
- Athena Martin as Elena
- Panos Koronis as Vassili
- Alba Rohrwacher as Female Hiker
- Nikos Poursanidis as Male Hiker
- Alexandros Mylonas as Professor Cole
- Konstantinos Samaa as Rough Boy

== Production ==
Maggie Gyllenhaal acquired the film rights to the Elena Ferrante novel in October 2018, and wrote and directed the adaptation. The lead character, Leda, says that she is named for the woman in the W. B. Yeats poem "Leda and the Swan", which Yeats based on the Leda story of Greek mythology.

In February 2020, Olivia Colman, Jessie Buckley, Dakota Johnson and Peter Sarsgaard were cast in the film. In August, Paul Mescal was added, and in October 2020, Oliver Jackson-Cohen was cast as well, with Ed Harris, Dagmara Domińczyk, Jack Farthing and Alba Rohrwacher joining in November.

Principal photography was filmed in Spetses, Greece, from September 28 to October 31, 2020.

== Music ==
The film's score was written by Dickon Hinchliffe, and released as a separate album through Milan Records on December 17, 2021. Another album which featured the original songs written and performed by singer-songwriter Monika Christodoulou was released on December 24.

== Release ==
The Lost Daughter had its world premiere at the 78th Venice International Film Festival on September 3, 2021. In August 2021, Netflix acquired distribution rights to the film in the United States and several other countries, adding more markets, including the United Kingdom, in October. The film screened at film festivals in the Telluride, Hamptons, London, Lyon Metropolis, Mill Valley, Montclair, New York, San Diego (closing night), Zurich, and Whistler Film Festival. It was released in the United States on December 17, 2021, in a limited release prior to streaming on Netflix on December 31, 2021.

== Reception ==
=== Critics ===
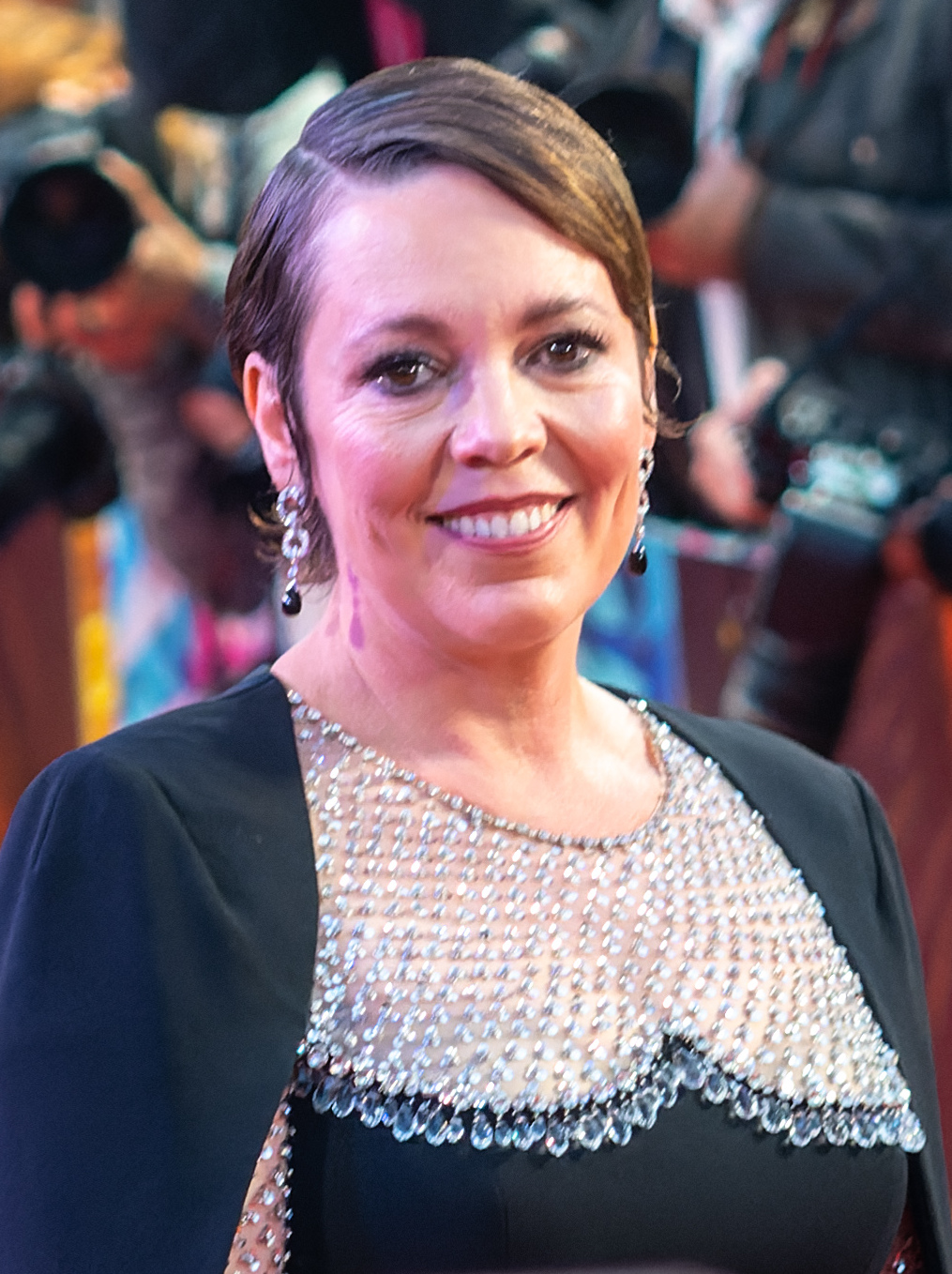
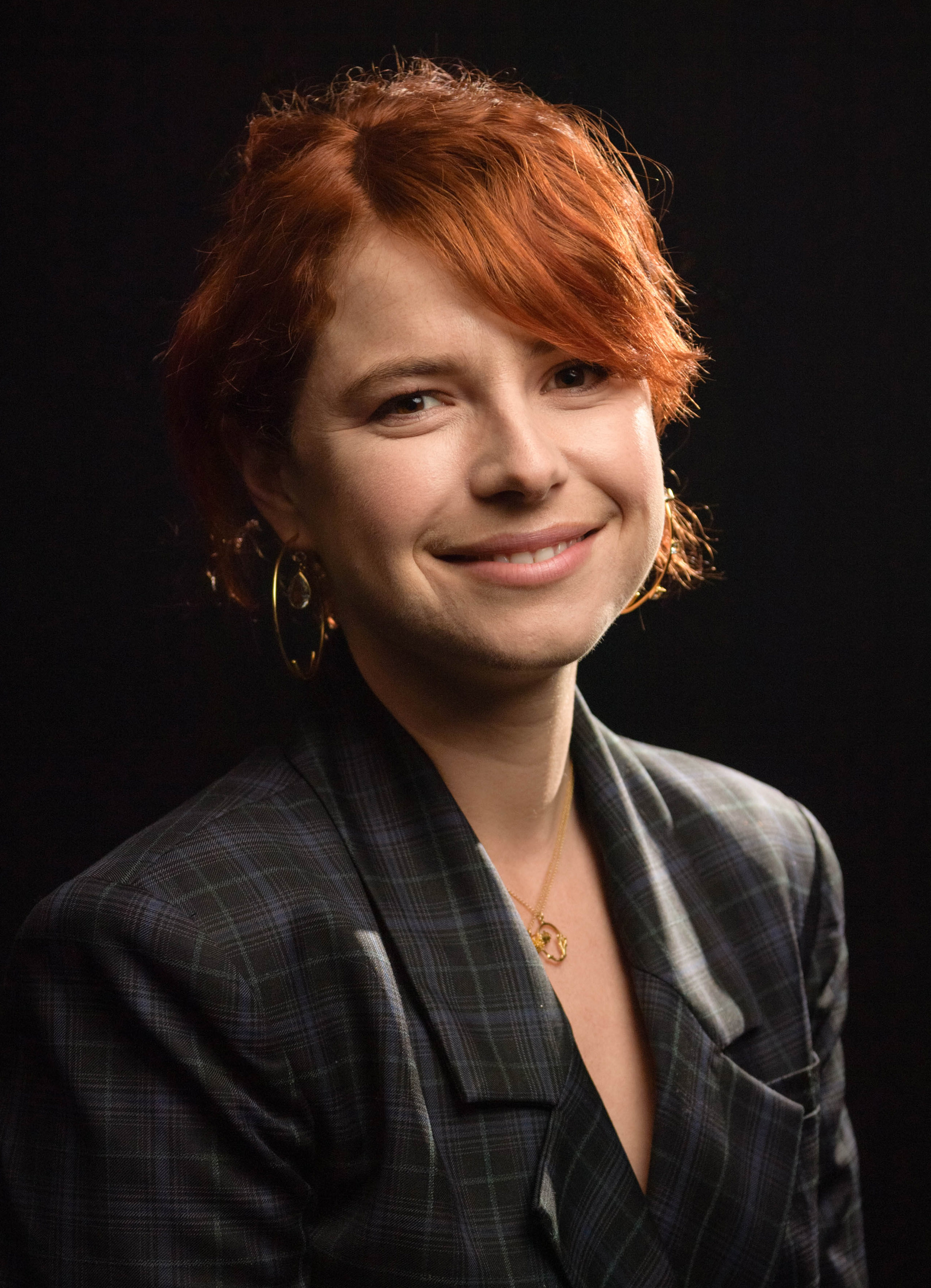
Olivia Colman and Jessie Buckley received critical acclaim for their performances and earned Academy Award nominations for Best Actress and Best Supporting Actress.

At its opening night world premiere, the movie received a four-minute standing ovation from Venice Film Festival attendees in the Sala Grande.

On Rotten Tomatoes, the film holds an approval rating of 94% based on 237 reviews, with an average rating of 8.4/10. The website's critics consensus reads: "A strikingly assured debut for writer-director Maggie Gyllenhaal, The Lost Daughter unites a brilliant cast in service of a daringly ambitious story." On Metacritic, it has a weighted average score of 86 out of 100, based on reviews from 51 critics, indicating "universal acclaim".

Mick LaSalle of the San Francisco Chronicle wrote: "Still, no matter how flat The Lost Daughter can sometimes seem, there's always something to hold our attention. The movie is never great, but it's never exactly dull. There's always a reason to stick around for the next scene."

Jeannette Catsoulis of The New York Times wrote: "Equal parts troubling and affecting, Leda epitomizes a type of woman whose needs are rarely addressed in American mainstream movies. We can dislike her, but we are never permitted to revile her." Michael Phillips of the Chicago Tribune wrote Gyllenhaal "keeps a close eye on what brings out the best in a scene, and in a story worth telling, with morally imperfect, fully dimensional, persistently human characters."

Alissa Wilkinson of Vox wrote "The movie captures the spirit of the novel well. It's suspenseful, but it's not a thriller; there are elements of obsession and eroticism, but they never quite go where you expect. The end is deeply ambiguous, neither punishing nor condoning its characters' behavior. It simply asks us to sit with them — to pay them the respect of attention, and learn something about ourselves in the process."

Actress and filmmaker Olivia Wilde praised the film, particularly Gyllenhaal's direction by saying "This unflinching new filmmaker only has time for the most interesting questions, it seems, and will not sanitize the narrative for our comfort. We have been warned: Maggie Gyllenhaal is here to push us to be a braver audience, and I, for one, am lapping it up from the front row."

In June 2025, IndieWire ranked the film at number 31 on its list of "The 100 Best Movies of the 2020s (So Far)".

=== Accolades ===
Award	Date of ceremony	Category	Recipients	Result	Ref.
Venice International Film Festival	September 11, 2021	Golden Lion	The Lost Daughter	Nominated	
Venice International Film Festival	September 11, 2021	Best Screenplay	Maggie Gyllenhaal	Won	
Gotham Independent Film Awards	November 29, 2021	Best Feature	Charles Dorfman, Maggie Gyllenhaal, Osnat Handelsman-Keren and Talia Kleinhendler	Won	
Gotham Independent Film Awards	November 29, 2021	Bingham Ray Breakthrough Director Award	Maggie Gyllenhaal	Won	
Gotham Independent Film Awards	November 29, 2021	Best Screenplay	Maggie Gyllenhaal	Won	
Gotham Independent Film Awards	November 29, 2021	Outstanding Lead Performance	Olivia Colman	Won	
Gotham Independent Film Awards	November 29, 2021	Outstanding Supporting Performance	Jessie Buckley	Nominated	
New York Film Critics Circle	December 3, 2021	Best First Film	The Lost Daughter	Won	
Washington D.C. Area Film Critics Association Awards	December 6, 2021	Best Actress	Olivia Colman	Nominated	
New York Film Critics Online	December 12, 2021	Top 10 Films of 2021	The Lost Daughter	Won	
Boston Society of Film Critics Awards	December 12, 2021	Best Supporting Actress	Jessie Buckley	Won	
Boston Society of Film Critics Awards	December 12, 2021	Best New Filmmaker	Maggie Gyllenhaal	Won	
Chicago Film Critics Association Awards	December 15, 2021	Best Actress	Olivia Colman	Nominated	
Chicago Film Critics Association Awards	December 15, 2021	Best Supporting Actress	Jessie Buckley	Nominated	
Chicago Film Critics Association Awards	December 15, 2021	Best Adapted Screenplay	Maggie Gyllenhaal	Nominated	
Chicago Film Critics Association Awards	December 15, 2021	Milos Stehlik Breakthrough Filmmaker Award	Maggie Gyllenhaal	Nominated	
St. Louis Gateway Film Critics Association Awards	December 19, 2021	Best Actress	Olivia Colman	Nominated	
Dallas–Fort Worth Film Critics Association	December 20, 2021	Best Picture	The Lost Daughter	Runner-up	
Dallas–Fort Worth Film Critics Association	December 20, 2021	Best Actress	Olivia Colman	Runner-up	
National Society of Film Critics	January 8, 2022	Best Supporting Actress	Jessie Buckley	Runner-up	
Alliance of Women Film Journalists Awards	January 2022	Best Film	The Lost Daughter	Nominated	
Alliance of Women Film Journalists Awards	January 2022	Best Director	Maggie Gyllenhaal	Nominated	
Alliance of Women Film Journalists Awards	January 2022	Best Screenplay, Adapted	Maggie Gyllenhaal	Nominated	
Alliance of Women Film Journalists Awards	January 2022	Best Woman Director	Maggie Gyllenhaal	Nominated	
Alliance of Women Film Journalists Awards	January 2022	Best Woman Screenwriter	Maggie Gyllenhaal	Nominated	
Alliance of Women Film Journalists Awards	January 2022	Best Actress	Olivia Colman	Won	
Alliance of Women Film Journalists Awards	January 2022	Most Daring Performance Award	Olivia Colman	Nominated	
Alliance of Women Film Journalists Awards	January 2022	Best Actress in a Supporting Role	Jessie Buckley	Nominated	
Golden Globe Awards	January 9, 2022	Best Director	Maggie Gyllenhaal	Nominated	
Golden Globe Awards	January 9, 2022	Best Actress in a Motion Picture – Drama	Olivia Colman	Nominated	
San Diego Film Critics Society	January 10, 2021	Best Director	Maggie Gyllenhaal	Nominated	
San Diego Film Critics Society	January 10, 2021	Best Actress	Olivia Colman	Nominated	
San Francisco Bay Area Film Critics Circle	January 10, 2022	Best Director	Maggie Gyllenhaal	Nominated	
San Francisco Bay Area Film Critics Circle	January 10, 2022	Best Actress	Olivia Colman	Won	
San Francisco Bay Area Film Critics Circle	January 10, 2022	Best Supporting Actress	Jessie Buckley	Nominated	
San Francisco Bay Area Film Critics Circle	January 10, 2022	Best Adapted Screenplay	Maggie Gyllenhaal	Nominated	
Austin Film Critics Association	January 11, 2022	Best Actress	Olivia Colman	Nominated	
Austin Film Critics Association	January 11, 2022	Best First Film	Maggie Gyllenhaal	Nominated	
Toronto Film Critics Association	January 16, 2022	Best Actress	Olivia Colman	Won	
Toronto Film Critics Association	January 16, 2022	Best Supporting Actress	Jessie Buckley	Won	
Toronto Film Critics Association	January 16, 2022	Best First Feature	Maggie Gyllenhaal	Won	
Houston Film Critics Society Awards	January 19, 2022	Best Actress	Olivia Colman	Nominated	
Houston Film Critics Society Awards	January 19, 2022	Best Supporting Actress	Jessie Buckley	Nominated	
Online Film Critics Society Awards	January 24, 2022	Best Actress	Olivia Colman	Won	
Online Film Critics Society Awards	January 24, 2022	Best Adapted Screenplay	Maggie Gyllenhaal	Nominated	
Online Film Critics Society Awards	January 24, 2022	Best Debut Feature	Maggie Gyllenhaal	Won	
London Film Critics Circle Awards	February 6, 2022	Film of the Year	The Lost Daughter	Nominated	
London Film Critics Circle Awards	February 6, 2022	Actress of the Year	Olivia Colman	Won	
London Film Critics Circle Awards	February 6, 2022	British/Irish Actress of the Year (for body of work)	Olivia Colman	Nominated	
London Film Critics Circle Awards	February 6, 2022	British/Irish Actress of the Year (for body of work)	Jessie Buckley	Nominated	
London Film Critics Circle Awards	February 6, 2022	Supporting Actress of the Year	Jessie Buckley	Nominated	
London Film Critics Circle Awards	February 6, 2022	Screenwriter of the Year	Maggie Gyllenhaal	Nominated	
Set Decorators Society of America Awards	February 22, 2022	Best Achievement in Decor/Design of a Contemporary Feature Film	Christine-Athina Vlachos, Inbal Weinberg	Nominated	
USC Scripter Awards	February 26, 2022	Best Adapted Screenplay - Film	Maggie Gyllenhaal	Won	
Screen Actors Guild Awards	February 27, 2021	Outstanding Performance by a Female Actor in a Leading Role	Olivia Colman	Nominated	
Art Directors Guild Awards	March 5, 2022	Excellence in Production Design for a Contemporary Film	Inbal Weinberg	Nominated	
Independent Spirit Awards	March 6, 2022	Best Feature	Charles Dorfman, Maggie Gyllenhaal, Osnat Handelsman-Keren and Talia Kleinhendler	Won	
Independent Spirit Awards	March 6, 2022	Best Director	Maggie Gyllenhaal	Won	
Independent Spirit Awards	March 6, 2022	Best Screenplay	Maggie Gyllenhaal	Won	
Independent Spirit Awards	March 6, 2022	Best Supporting Female	Jessie Buckley	Nominated	
Directors Guild of America Awards	March 12, 2022	Outstanding Directing – First-Time Feature Film	Maggie Gyllenhaal	Won	
IFTA Film & Drama Awards	March 12, 2022	Actress in a supporting role	Jessie Buckley	Won	
Critics' Choice Movie Awards	March 13, 2022	Best Actress	Olivia Colman	Nominated	
Critics' Choice Movie Awards	March 13, 2022	Best Adapted Screenplay	Maggie Gyllenhaal	Nominated	
British Academy Film Awards	March 13, 2022	Best Actress in a Supporting Role	Jessie Buckley	Nominated	
British Academy Film Awards	March 13, 2022	Best Adapted Screenplay	Maggie Gyllenhaal	Nominated	
Artios Awards	March 17, 2022	Outstanding Achievement in Casting - Studio or Independent (Drama)	Kahleen Crawford	Nominated	
Academy Awards	March 27, 2022	Best Actress	Olivia Colman	Nominated	
Academy Awards	March 27, 2022	Best Supporting Actress	Jessie Buckley	Nominated	
Academy Awards	March 27, 2022	Best Adapted Screenplay	Maggie Gyllenhaal	Nominated	
Satellite Awards	April 2, 2022	Best Motion Picture – Drama	The Lost Daughter	Nominated	
Satellite Awards	April 2, 2022	Best Actress in a Motion Picture – Drama	Olivia Colman	Nominated	
Satellite Awards	April 2, 2022	Best Adapted Screenplay	Maggie Gyllenhaal	Nominated	
