= Dakota Johnson =

American actress (born 1989)

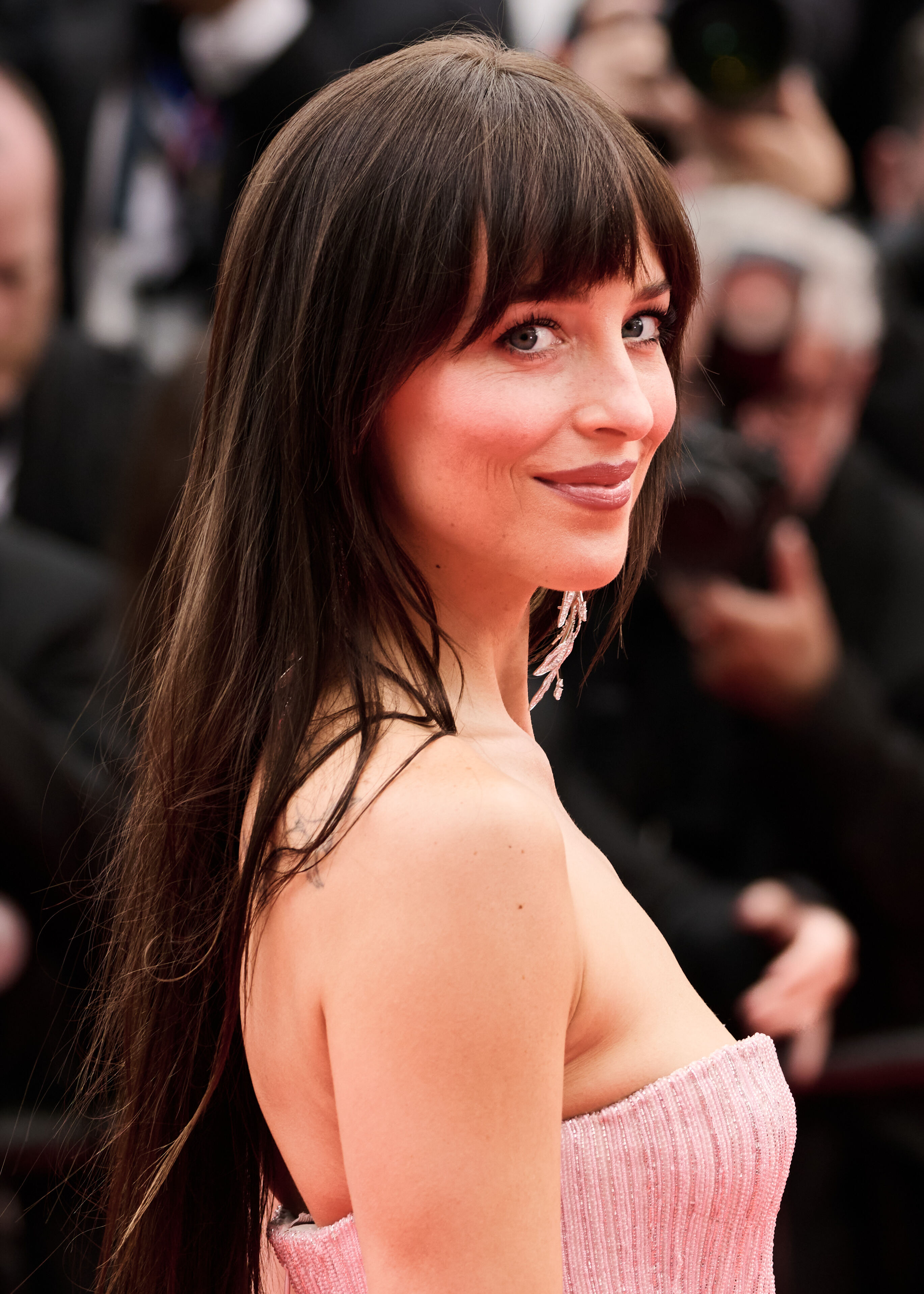
- Johnson in 2025
- Born: Dakota Mayi Johnson; October 4, 1989 (age 37); Austin, Texas, U.S.
- Occupation: Actress
- Years active: 1999–present
- Partner: Chris Martin (2017–2025)
- Parents: Don Johnson; Melanie Griffith
- Relatives: Jesse Johnson (half-brother); Tippi Hedren (grandmother); Tracy Griffith (half-aunt)
- Awards: Full list

Dakota Mayi Johnson (born October 4, 1989) is an American actress. Her accolades include nominations for a British Academy Film Award and a Critics' Choice Award. She was featured in the Forbes 30 Under 30 list in 2016.

The daughter of actors Don Johnson and Melanie Griffith, she began acting at a young age. Johnson's early credits include a supporting role in the biographical drama film The Social Network (2010), before landing a starring role in the Fox sitcom Ben and Kate (2012–2013). Her breakthrough came as Anastasia Steele in the Fifty Shades film trilogy (2015–2018), which collectively grossed more than $1 billion worldwide and established her as a sex symbol. She has since starred in major-studio films such as How to Be Single (2016), Bad Times at the El Royale (2018), Madame Web (2024), and Materialists (2025), and earned praise for her performances in The Peanut Butter Falcon (2019), Cha Cha Real Smooth (2022), and Am I OK? (2022).

== Early life ==
Dakota Mayi Johnson was born on October 4, 1989, in Austin, Texas, to actors Don Johnson and Melanie Griffith. Her father was shooting the film The Hot Spot (1990) in Texas when she was born. Her maternal grandparents are advertising executive and former child actor Peter Griffith, and actress Tippi Hedren. She is a half-niece of actress Tracy Griffith and production designer Clay A. Griffith. Actor Antonio Banderas is her former stepfather. Her maternal ancestry is Swedish and Norwegian.

Johnson has a complex family, as each of her parents had children by three different people. Her six half-siblings are: Jesse Johnson (b. 1982), from her father's relationship with Patti D'Arbanville; Alexander Bauer (b. 1985), from her mother's marriage to Steven Bauer; Stella Banderas (b. 1996), from her mother's marriage to Banderas; Grace (b. 1999), Jasper (b. 2002), and Deacon Johnson (b. 2006), from her father's marriage to Kelley Phleger.

Owing to her parents' occupations, Johnson spent much of her childhood in their various filming locations and accompanying them to premieres. She also spent time in Aspen and Woody Creek, Colorado, where, in her teen years, she worked summers at the local market. In Woody Creek, Hunter S. Thompson was one of her neighbors. She also attended the Aspen Community School for a time. "I was so consistently unmoored and discombobulated, I didn't have an anchor anywhere," Johnson recalled. She attended the Santa Catalina School in Monterey, California, for her freshman year of high school before transferring to the private New Roads School in Santa Monica, California.

Johnson became interested in modeling at age 12 after participating in a photo shoot with other celebrities' children for Teen Vogue. She subsequently earned an income modeling while attending high school in Santa Monica. She has struggled with depression since around age 14 and checked into rehabilitation. Even as a child, Johnson was interested in acting, having spent significant time on film sets with her parents, but they discouraged her from pursuing the profession until she graduated from high school. After reaching that milestone, she applied to Juilliard School, performing in her audition monologues by Shakespeare and Steve Martin, but was not accepted.

== Career ==
=== 1999–2014: Beginnings ===
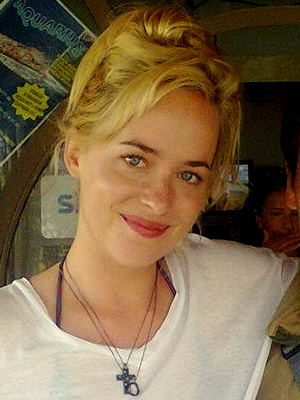
Johnson on the set of A Bigger Splash in late 2014

In 1999, Johnson made her film debut in Crazy in Alabama, where she and her half-sister Stella Banderas played daughters to their real-life mother, Griffith. The film was directed by Griffith's then-husband Antonio Banderas and was based on the 1993 novel by Mark Childress. In 2006, she was chosen as Miss Golden Globe, where she served as the first second-generation Miss Golden Globe in the Globes' history. That same year, Johnson signed with IMG Models. Though acting is her primary work, she has since modeled for MANGO brand's jeans line in 2009 and shot the "Rising Star" campaign for Australian fashion label Wish in 2011.

After graduating from high school, Johnson took acting classes with teacher Tom Todoroff until 2008. She signed with the William Morris Agency and started her acting career. She had a minor role in David Fincher's biographical film The Social Network (2010) and also had a small role in the fantasy film Beastly (2011). Johnson starred in So Yong Kim's drama For Ellen (2012), alongside Paul Dano and Jon Heder. The film is about a struggling musician in the midst of a custody battle. Also in 2012, she played a student at a prep school in Christopher Neil's independent comedy Goats. She also starred in Nicholas Stoller's romance film The Five-Year Engagement and the comedy 21 Jump Street. She had a leading role for Chris Nelson's film Date and Switch.

In March 2012, Johnson had a leading role in the Fox comedy television series Ben and Kate. It was canceled on January 25, 2013, after one season. Johnson continued acting in films, with a small role in Need for Speed (2014). In 2013, she had a role as one of the new hires on the series finale episode of the NBC comedy series The Office.

=== 2015–2019: Breakthrough ===
Johnson's breakthrough came with her leading role as Anastasia "Ana" Steele in the erotic romantic drama film Fifty Shades of Grey, which was released in February 2015 and brought her international recognition. Johnson won the role over Lucy Hale, Felicity Jones, Elizabeth Olsen, Danielle Panabaker, and Shailene Woodley. In response to questions regarding her stance on gender rights concerning her character in the Fifty Shades film series, Johnson stated: "I'm proud of [the film]. I completely disagree with people who think Ana's weak. I think she's actually stronger than he is. Everything she does is her choice. And if I can be an advocate for women to do what they want to do with their bodies and not be ashamed of what they want, then I'm all for that." While the trilogy was widely criticized, Johnson received praise for often being the standout performer. However, her role in the first film won her first Golden Raspberry Award for Worst Actress, as well as an Award for Worst Screen Combo, which she shared alongside Jamie Dornan. She received nominations in the same categories for Fifty Shades Darker (2017), though she did not win. She reprised her role for the trilogy's final film, Fifty Shades Freed (2018).

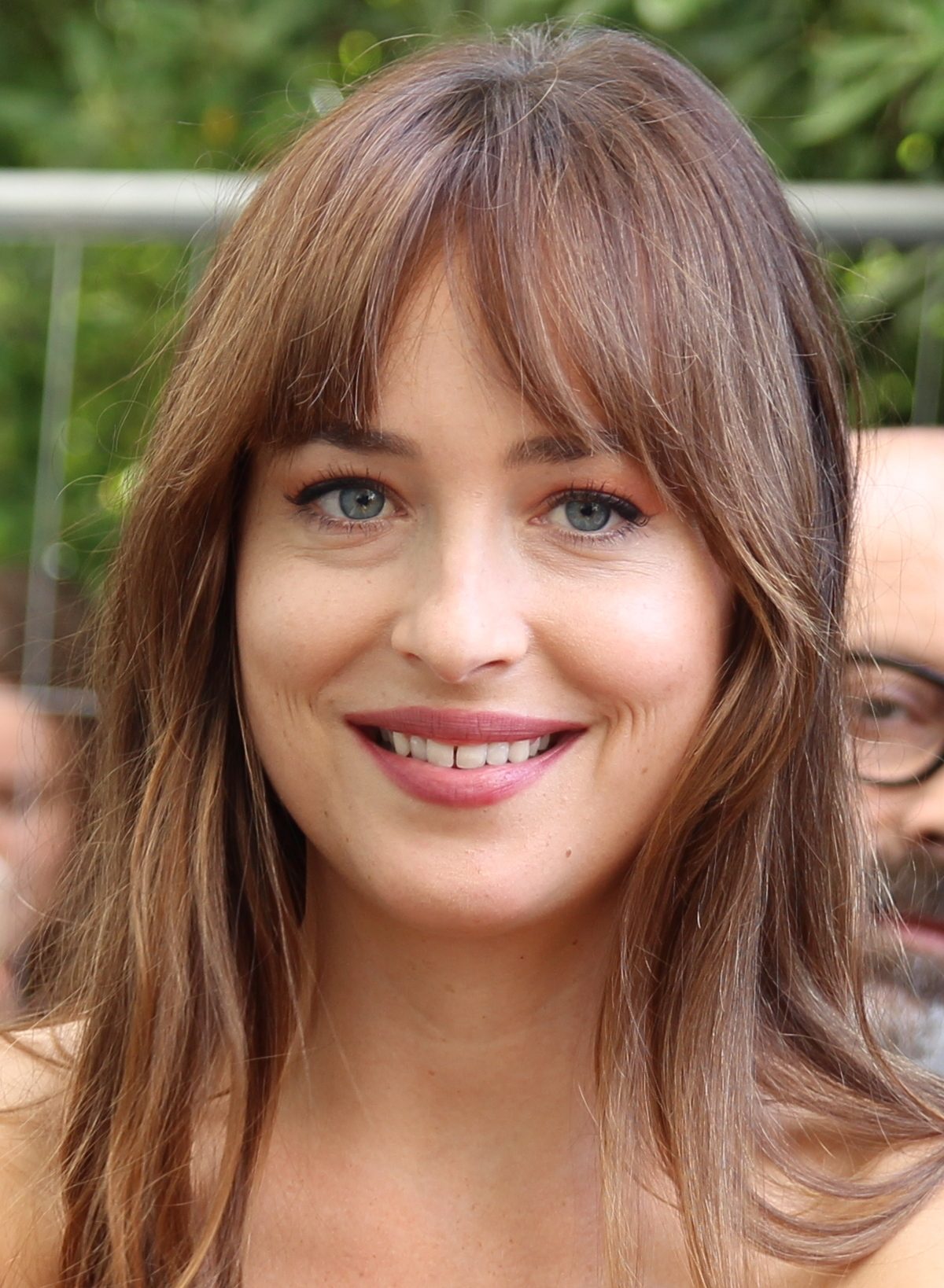
Johnson at the 75th Venice International Film Festival in September 2018

On February 15, 2015, Johnson appeared on Saturday Night Live's 40th anniversary special and hosted SNL on February 28, 2015, making her the second daughter of a former SNL host (after Gwyneth Paltrow, whose mother Blythe Danner hosted during the show's seventh season in 1982) to host the show. Also in 2015, she reunited with her 21 Jump Street cast member Johnny Depp, playing the mother of his character's child in the feature film Black Mass. Jessica Kiang of IndieWire said that she "makes something of nothing" in her role. In 2015, Johnson starred in Luca Guadagnino's thriller A Bigger Splash, alongside Tilda Swinton, Matthias Schoenaerts, and Ralph Fiennes. Writing for Rolling Stone, Peter Travers stated that Johnson showed that her character "has more on her mind than slithering seductively". According to Christy Lemire from RogerEbert.com: "A Bigger Splash allows Johnson to be both funnier and sexier than she was in Fifty Shades of Grey". The same year saw the release of Cymbeline, a modern film adaptation of the William Shakespeare play, in which she starred alongside Ethan Hawke and Ed Harris. She also played a lead in the 2016 comedy How to Be Single, with Leslie Mann and her Date and Switch co-star Nicholas Braun. She performed a cover of the Frankie Valli song "Can't Take My Eyes Off of You", alongside Zani Jones Mbayise, Vanessa Rubio and Damon Wayans Jr. for the soundtrack of the film. Johnson was invited to join the Academy of Motion Picture Arts and Sciences in June 2016.

Johnson starred in Luca Guadagnino's supernatural horror film Suspiria (2018), a remake of the 1977 film, in which she played an American dancer in Berlin who enrolls in an academy run by a coven of witches. David Ehrlich of IndieWire described Johnson's performance in the film as "thrillingly unrepentant". Also in 2018, she starred in Drew Goddard's neo-noir thriller Bad Times at the El Royale, with Jeff Bridges, Jon Hamm, Cynthia Erivo, and Chris Hemsworth. In the film, she played a hippie staying at a resort on the California-Nevada border where the lives of various people with suspicious pasts intersect. Screen Rant ranked Johnson's performance as the fourth-best in the film and stated that "she brings a reserved, under-the-surface power to her role".

In 2019, Johnson starred opposite Armie Hammer in Babak Anvari's psychological horror film Wounds, which is based on Nathan Ballingrud's horror novella The Visible Filth. It had its world premiere at the Sundance Film Festival on January 26, 2019. Johnson starred in the well-reviewed independent adventure film The Peanut Butter Falcon, alongside Shia LaBeouf, Zack Gottsagen, and Bruce Dern. The film premiered at South by Southwest on March 9, 2019. It became the highest grossing independent film of the year. While promoting the film on The Ellen DeGeneres Show, Johnson had a notably tense interaction with the show's host Ellen DeGeneres regarding a birthday party invite – leading to Johnson saying the now-famous phrase, "that's not the truth, Ellen." She starred in Gabriela Cowperthwaite's drama film Our Friend, alongside Casey Affleck and Jason Segel. The film is based upon real life couple Nicole and Matthew Teague, faced with Nicole's impending death, see their best friend move in with them to help them out. Johnson sang again during the film, performing a cover of "If I Had the World to Give" by the Grateful Dead. Joe Morgenstern of The Wall Street Journal wrote that the "intimacy of Ms. Johnson's performance is extraordinary. She is the least assertive of movie stars, yet the courage, despair and fury she finds in Nicole will lift you up and spin you around". While Gary Goldstein from the Los Angeles Times stated that Johnson "impresses with affecting range — from flirty, ebullient and adoring to stalwart, enraged and resigned; it's a lovely performance".

=== 2020–present: Recent work ===
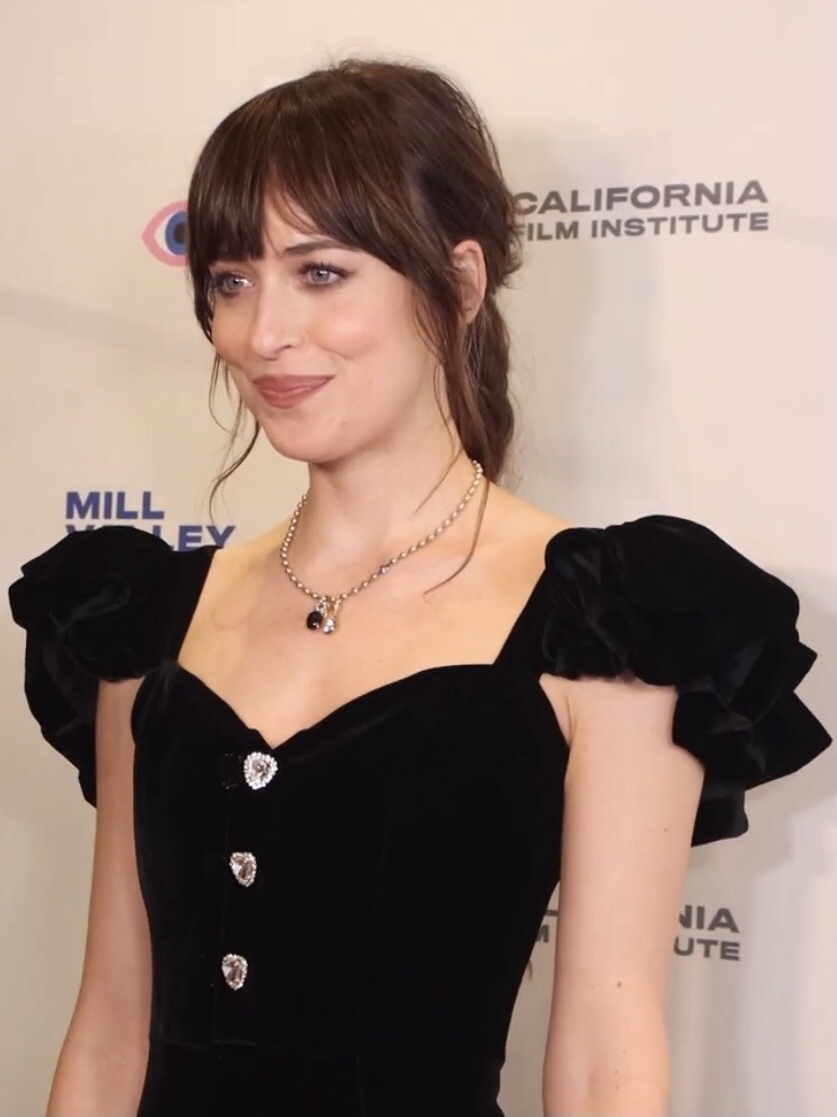
Johnson at the 2021 Mill Valley Film Festival

Johnson founded the production company TeaTime Pictures, alongside former Netflix development executive Ro Donnelly, to develop films and television series. In 2020, Johnson made her directorial debut, co-directing (with Cory Bailey) the music video for Coldplay's "Cry Cry Cry", which featured her then boyfriend Chris Martin. Johnson starred alongside Tracee Ellis Ross in the dramedy film The High Note, which was released on May 29, 2020. Ann Hornaday of The Washington Post wrote that "she's lovely to look at and can never be accused of overacting, but in terms of conveying single-minded drive, Johnson is no match for [Tracee Ellis] Ross's carefully calibrated tonal swings between imperiousness, self-awareness, isolation and down-to-earth intimacy." Conversely Richard Roeper of the Chicago Sun Times saw it as "maybe her best and certainly most lovable performance."

In 2021, she co-starred in The Lost Daughter, directed by Maggie Gyllenhaal and based on Elena Ferrante's novel of the same name. In December 2021, Boat Rocker Media acquired a minority interest for TeaTime Pictures. In 2022, she starred in the Netflix film adaptation of author Jane Austen's Persuasion. Johnson co-produced and starred in several films. She played a lesbian in Am I OK?, which was directed by Stephanie Allynne and Tig Notaro. She played a young mother with an autistic child in Cha Cha Real Smooth, in which she starred opposite Cooper Raiff. Johnson played a cab passenger who has an emotionally profound interaction with a cabbie in the film Daddio, in which she starred opposite Sean Penn. Her performances in The Lost Daughter, Persuasion, Cha Cha Real Smooth, and Daddio were met with positive reception from critics and audiences.

In November 2023, Johnson departed WME and signed a representation deal with Creative Artists Agency. She played the title role in the superhero film Madame Web (2024), set in Sony's Spider-Man Universe. It was produced on a budget of $80 million and was critically and commercially unsuccessful, earning her a second Golden Raspberry Award for Worst Actress. Johnson said about the film: "We don't have control over how something turns out. (I) signed on to a movie that, by the end of shooting it, (was) a completely different script than what I attached to, and that is a crazy journey to go on as an artist. Because you're like, 'OK, I'm doing something with my actual body and my actual mind and my heart and my emotions,' and it's just being taken and fucked with, but you can't do anything about it. Like, what am I going to do, fucking cry about Madame Web? No. I'm gonna laugh."

In 2025, Johnson had a supporting role in the comedy film Splitsville which she also served as a producer. That same year, she had a leading role in Celine Song's romance film Materialists (2025), alongside Chris Evans and Pedro Pascal. Johnson starred with Anne Hathaway and Josh Hartnett in Michael Showalter's film adaptation of Colleen Hoover's novel Verity (2026). Johnson is set to make her feature-length directorial debut with the film A Tree is Blue, written by Vanessa Burghardt who is her co-star in Cha Cha Real Smooth. She starred opposite Colin Farrell in the music video of Taylor Swift's "Patient Zero" (2026).

== Public image ==
Johnson's role in the Fifty Shades film series established her as a sex symbol early in her career. Since then, her performances have diversified, ranging from supporting roles in blockbusters and art films to leading roles in prestige films. In 2024, she said that she does not “discriminate against movie genres” when choosing acting projects. She has also said she is willing to accept smaller roles, provided the character interests her, and that she uses each one as an opportunity to hone her craft.

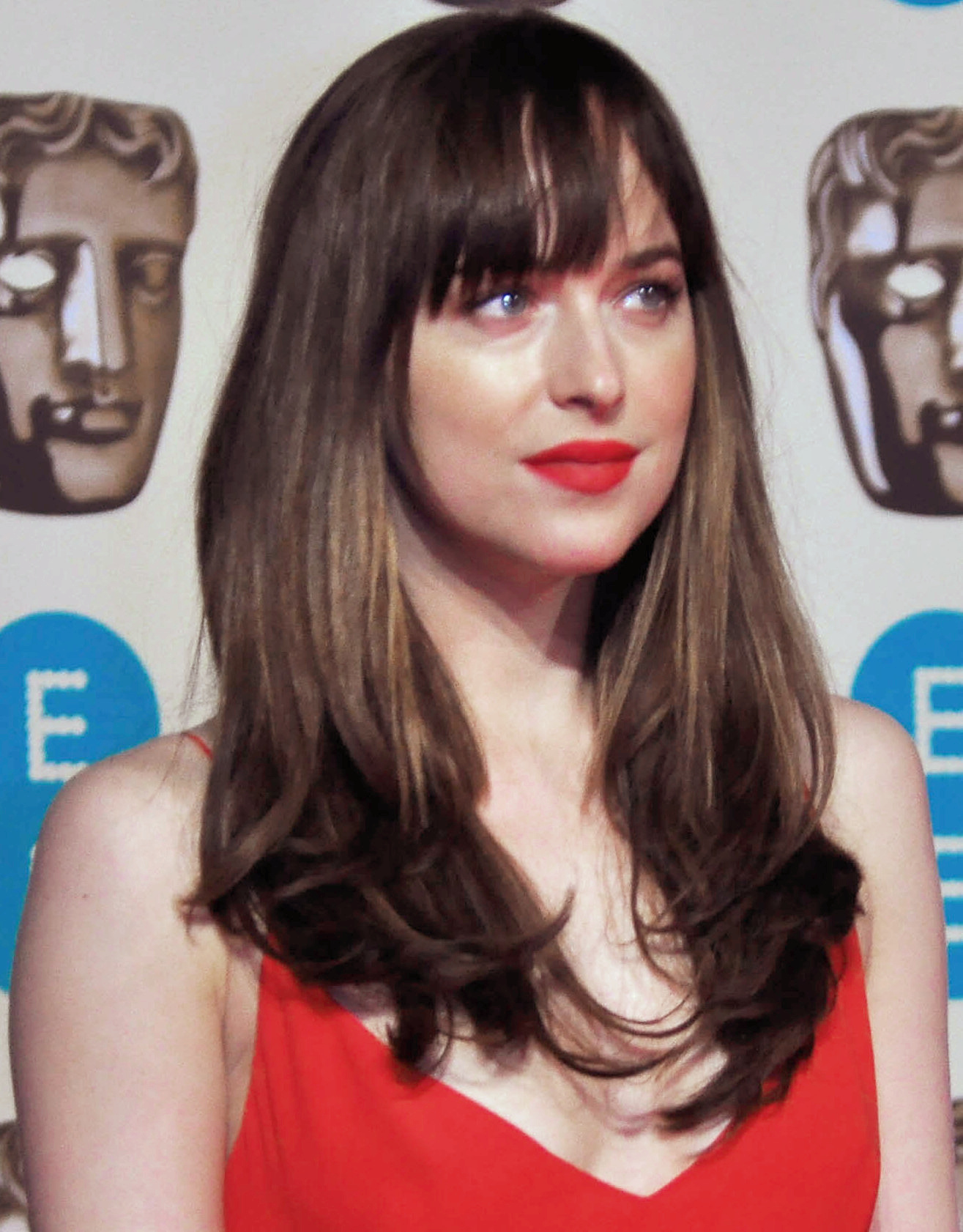
Johnson at the 2016 BAFTAs

Johnson's acting has often drawn a polarized response from critics. While some reviewers have criticized her performances as wooden, emotionally detached, or lacking range, others have praised her subtle, understated, and emotionally nuanced work, as well as her willingness to take creative risks. Tom W. Clarke of The Sydney Morning Herald labeled her "the most unfairly maligned actor in Hollywood", while Louis Chilton of The Independent and Sonia Rao of The Washington Post argued that few of her films fully capitalize on her unusual, enigmatic strengths. Miriam Handel of The Daily Beast and Coleman Spilde of Salon agreed that Johnson frequently elevates the material she is given, and Clarke said she excels at "playing complex characters on journeys of self-discovery". Luca Guadagnino, who directed her in Suspiria, described her as a bold, bombastic, and committed performer.

Johnson has been described as refreshingly candid and relatable in her off-screen appearances, with her interview clips and quotes consistently going viral online. Texas Monthly’s Meher Yeda observed that her press appearances often overshadow the films she is promoting. Her press tour for Madame Web was particularly noted by the media, with her remarks and demeanor receiving significant news coverage due to her self-awareness and apparent indifference towards the film’s reception. Regarding her press tour for Materialists, Taryn Ryder of Yahoo! Entertainment said the actress "reminded us why she’s one of the most magnetic, self-aware stars working today ... effortlessly chic, disarmingly unfiltered and entirely in control of the narrative". Stephanie McNeal of Glamour described Johnson’s public persona as “acerbic, witty, [and] deadpan”, noting that she has, in her own way, become something of an “America’s sweetheart”. In 2024, film critic Stephanie Zacharek said the actress had endeared herself to the general public through a combination of unfiltered responses, intelligence, dry wit, and commitment to diverse performances.

As a child of well-known actors, Johnson’s career and the extent to which her family background influenced her opportunities have been discussed in the media. While she has acknowledged benefiting from a degree of privilege, she has also described the broader discourse surrounding nepo babies as “boring”, particularly among journalists. She has also poked fun at the label in her appearances on Saturday Night Live.

== Personal life ==
Johnson was previously involved in long-term relationships with musician Noah Gersh and actor Jordan Masterson. She dated Matthew Hitt, the lead vocalist of Welsh indie rock band Drowners, intermittently for almost two years until 2016. She and Coldplay's vocalist Chris Martin started dating in October 2017. They resided together in Malibu, California and were engaged. It was reported in June 2025 that the couple split up after eight years of dating. She then briefly dated singer-songwriter Role Model in 2026.

=== Activism ===
Johnson has been named a brand ambassador for luxury fashion brand Gucci. In 2018, she collaborated with 300 women in Hollywood to set up the Time's Up initiative to protect women from harassment and discrimination. In November 2020, it was announced that she had become an investor and co-creative director of Maude, a sexual wellness brand.

== Filmography ==
Key
†	Denotes films that have not yet been released

=== Film ===
Year	Title	Role	Notes	Ref.
1999	Crazy in Alabama	Sondra		
2010	The Social Network	Amelia "Amy" Ritter		
2010	All That Glitters	Dianica French	Short film	
2011	Beastly	Sloan Hagen		
2012	For Ellen	Cynthia "Cindy" Taylor		
2012	Goats	Minnie		
2012	21 Jump Street	Fugazy		
2012	The Five-Year Engagement	Audrey		
2012	Transit	Elizabeth	Short film	
2014	Date and Switch	Em		
2014	Need for Speed	Anita Coleman		
2014	Cymbeline	Imogen		
2014	Closed Set	Leading Lady	Short film	
2015	Fifty Shades of Grey	Anastasia "Ana" Steele		
2015	Chloe and Theo	Chloe		
2015	Black Mass	Lindsay Cyr		
2015	A Bigger Splash	Penelope Lannier		
2015	In a Relationship	Willa	Short film	
2015	Vale	Rachel	Short film	
2016	How to Be Single	Alice Kepley		
2017	Fifty Shades Darker	Anastasia "Ana" Steele		
2018	Fifty Shades Freed	Anastasia "Ana" Steele		
2018	Suspiria	Susanna "Susie" Bannion		
2018	Bad Times at the El Royale	Emily Summerspring		
2019	Wounds	Carrie		
2019	The Peanut Butter Falcon	Eleanor		
2019	Our Friend	Nicole Teague		
2020	The Nowhere Inn	Herself		
2020	The High Note	Maggie Sherwoode		
2021	The Lost Daughter	Nina		
2022	Cha Cha Real Smooth	Domino	Also producer	
2022	Am I OK?	Lucy	Also producer	
2022	Persuasion	Anne Elliot		
2023	The Disappearance of Shere Hite	Shere Hite	Voice role Documentary film; also executive producer	
2023	Daddio	Girlie	Also producer	
2024	Madame Web	Cassandra "Cassie" Webb / Madame Web		
2024	Loser Baby	—N/a	Short film; directorial debut	
2025	Splitsville	Julie	Also producer	
2025	Materialists	Lucy Mason		
2026	Flesh Impact	Marilyn Monroe	Short film	
2026	Verity	Lowen Ashleigh	Also executive producer	
TBA	The Three Incestuous Sisters †	Clothilde	Filming; also producer	

=== Television ===
Year	Title	Role	Notes	Ref.
2012–2013	Ben and Kate	Kate Fox	Main role; 16 episodes	
2013	The Office	Dakota	Episode: "Finale"	
2015	Saturday Night Live 40th Anniversary Special	Herself	Television special	
2015–2026	Saturday Night Live	Herself / various	3 episodes as host; 1 episode as guest	
2023	Slip	—N/a	Executive producer	

=== Music video ===
Year	Title	Artist	Role	Notes	Ref.
2015	"Earned It"	The Weeknd	Stripper		
2020	"Cry Cry Cry"	Coldplay	—N/a	Co-directed with Cory Bailey	
2022	"Biutyful"	Coldplay	—N/a	Writer	
2025	"I Love You"	Tobias Jesso Jr.	Herself		
2026	"Patient Zero"	Taylor Swift	Socialite		

== Awards and nominations ==
Among her accolades, Johnson received the Robert Altman Award from the Independent Spirit Awards as a part of the ensemble for Suspiria. For her role in the Fifty Shades film series, she received a People's Choice Award, as well as nomination for two MTV Movie & TV Awards. She was nominated for BAFTA Rising Star Award in 2016.
