= Monika Christodoulou =

Monika
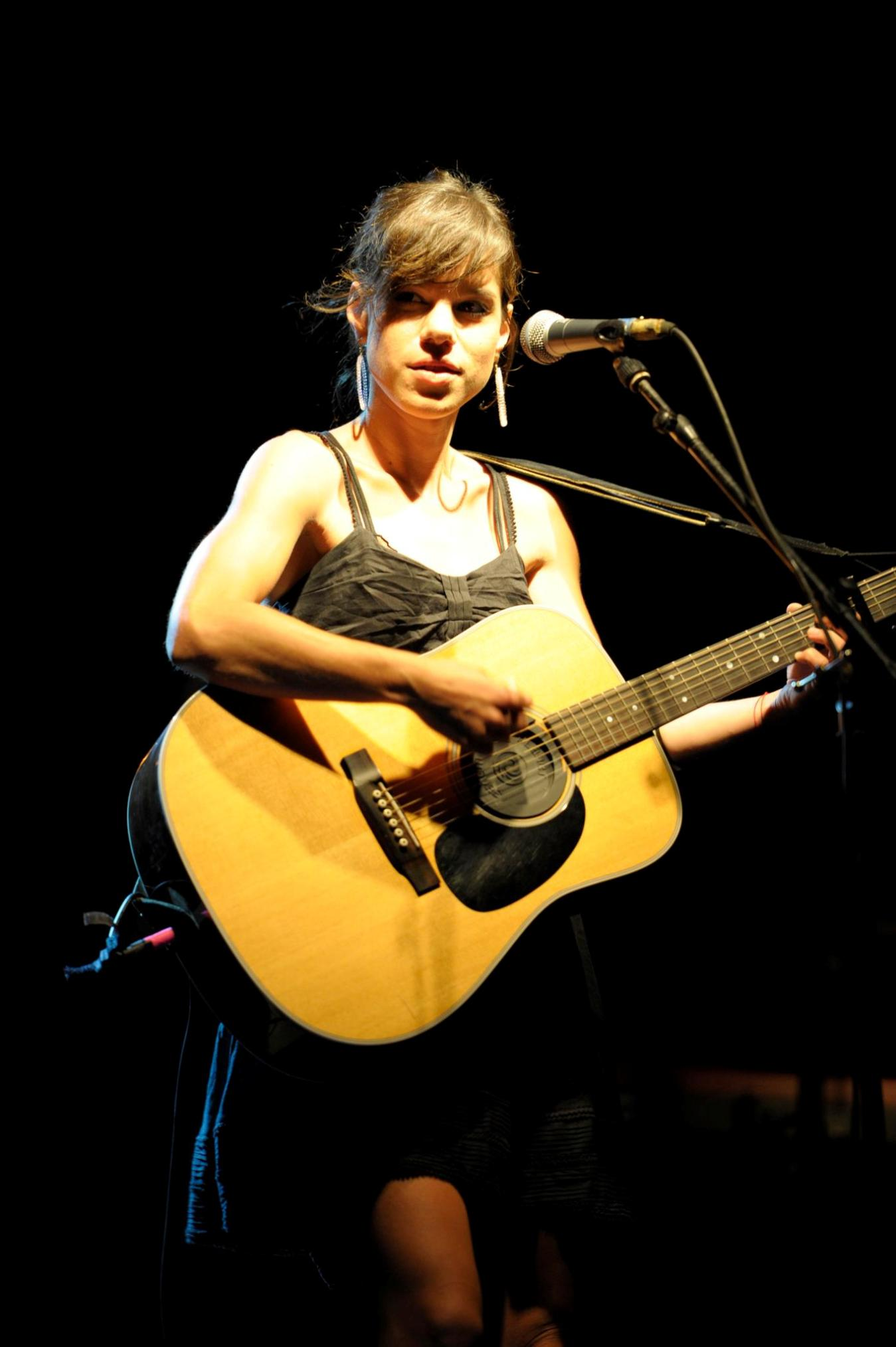
- Monika performing at Castro Platamona, 2011

Background information
- Born: Monika (Lemonia) Christodoulou (Μόνικα Χριστοδούλου); May 26, 1985 (age 41); Athens, Greece
- Genres: Folk pop, blues, independent music
- Occupations: Singer, songwriter
- Instruments: Vocals, guitar, piano
- Years active: 2005–present
- Labels: Archangel, Fat Possum, Other Music, Royal Music
- Website: iammonika.com

Monika Christodoulou (Greek: Μόνικα Χριστοδούλου, born May 26, 1985, in Athens, Greece) also known by her stage name Monika, is a Greek singer-songwriter. Her debut album Avatar was released in 2008 and her second album Exit followed in 2010. Both albums achieved platinum status in her native Greece and were met with critical acclaim. Her third album, Secret in the Dark, was the first to be given an international release, in 2015. It was recorded in New York in collaboration with musicians from the Dap-Kings, and sees Christodoulou moving away from the folk, singer-songwriter style of her earlier albums towards a disco and funk sound.

== Early life ==
Christodoulou was born in Athens on May 26, 1985. Her origin is from Astros in Arcadia. She grew up in various cities around Greece, such as Korinthos, Lamia and Karpenisi, moving around due to her father's occupation as a doctor. In 2004 she was accepted at the School of Mathematics of Kapodistriako University of Athens (EKPA). She made her first musical steps by joining her brother's rock band Serpentine, where she sang and played the guitar and saxophone. While she was in Serpentine, the band opened for local and international acts such as Devendra Banhart, Michael Gira and Raining Pleasure. Serpentine disbanded in 2004 and Monika started pursuing a solo career.

== Music career ==
Monika took part in many local bands' live gigs and albums, as a guitar and saxophone player and vocalist. In 2006 she completed her own demo, recorded at her home, and distributed it around Athens as well as uploading it on MySpace, where it became a word of mouth sensation, garnered her a spot as opening act for Calexico (with whom she performed "An Thymitheis T' Oneiro Mou" live in Crete) and spawned her first breakthrough song "Over The Hill". This led to Archangel Music, a Greek indie label, discovering and signing her in 2007. Monika's debut album, Avatar. was released in May 2008. Produced by Ottomo (real name Nikos Aggloupas) and with Martin Wenk from Calexico as a guest trumpet player, it features confessional lyrics and was influenced by artists including Leonard Cohen, Ennio Morricone, and Arcade Fire. It sold over 30,000 copies in Greece, achieving platinum status. The video for her single "Over The Hill" was nominated for Best Alternative Video at the 2010 MAD Video Music Awards.

Monika's second album Exit was released in May 2010, co-produced by Monika and Ottomo. It was recorded in Athens and Berlin and became Monika's second consecutive platinum release. A few months later, she completed her first original composition for the stage production Mom – Life Is Wildly Incredible by Angela Brouskou, which premiered in November 2011. In January 2013, Monika co-created Primal, a multimedia-enhanced series of live concerts at the Onassis Cultural Center in Athens, based on her two personal albums. An EP with the same name was subsequently released, featuring six new songs and released in the form of a sketchbook with a CD included. Monika has written the music score for the stage adaptation of Sophocles's "Antigone"

Monika's third album is Secret in the Dark. The album was recorded in New York in collaboration with Homer Steinweiss and Thomas Brenneck, both members of the Dap-Kings who previously worked on Amy Winehouse's Back to Black (2006). A review for The Guardian describes the album as "a wholly Daptone Records affair that attempts to stuff the irrepressible energies of disco, funk and soul into one package."

Monika has also created the music for the new stage version of the Russian classic The Brothers Karamazov.

She has performed live in many prestigious theaters in Greece such as the Lycabettus Hill Theater, Odeon Herodes Atticus and The Little Theatre of Ancient Epidaurus.

== Discography ==
=== Albums ===
- Avatar (2008)
- Exit (2010)
- Secret in the Dark (2015)
- The garden is blooming - O Kipos Einai Anthiros (2019)
- PROUD (2023)

=== EP ===
- Primal (2013)

=== Singles ===
- "Over the Hill" (2008)
- "Baby"' (2009)
