= The Pirates! In an Adventure with Scientists! (soundtrack) =

2012 film soundtrack album

The Pirates! In an Adventure with Scientists! (Original Motion Picture Score) (Note: released internationally as The Pirates! Band of Misfits (Original Motion Picture Soundtrack))

Film score by Theodore Shapiro
- Released: 24 April 2012
- Recorded: 2012
- Genre: Film score
- Length: 51:04
- Label: Madison Gate Records

Theodore Shapiro chronology
The Big Year (2011)	The Pirates! In an Adventure with Scientists! (2012)	Hope Springs (2012)

The Pirates! In an Adventure with Scientists! (Original Motion Picture Score) is the soundtrack album composed by Theodore Shapiro for the film of the same name and released by Madison Gate Records on 24 April 2012.

== Development ==
Theodore Shapiro composed the film's musical score whose involvement was confirmed in March 2011. It was Shapiro's animated feature film debut. He provided a punk-based orchestral theme that developed in conjunction with the pop songs incorporated throughout the screenplay. Peter Lord described the film's musical score to be "mischeivous". The score was released internationally under the Madison Gate Records on 24 April 2012 in digital formats and as a CD-R format on 17 May.

== Reception ==
Leslie Felperin of Variety wrote "the eclectic soundtrack choices add a contempo vibe with a mix of reggae classics and tunes by Supergrass and Flight of the Conchords." Chris Knight of National Post wrote "The Brit-pop soundtrack, meanwhile, feels intrusive rather than natural". Mark Adams of Screen International considered Theodore Shapiro's score as "bombastic". Barrie Advance of Simcoe.com wrote "The film's score, composed by Theodore Shapiro, is another of the movie's high points. Shapiro's compositions manage to suit the swashbuckling, and eventually strange, adventure perfectly without sounding derivative of the well-known leitmotifs of Disney's beloved Pirates of the Caribbean franchise."

== Track listing ==
No.	Title	Length
1.	"I Hate Pirates!"	2:25
2.	"Attacking Ships"	2:22
3.	"The Competition"	2:18
4.	"Not a Total Success"	2:03
5.	"The Ascent of Man"	0:38
6.	"Masked Monkey Chase"	2:20
7.	"Attacking the Beagle"	2:31
8.	"Feathery Heart and Soul"	0:43
9.	"Fog on the Thames"	1:02
10.	"Girl Guides"	2:24
11.	"Wait a Mo'!"	5:17
12.	"Dreams Turn to Dust"	0:46
13.	"The Captain's Dream"	1:33
14.	"Baby Clothes"	2:56
15.	"The Queen's Lair"	4:28
16.	"Market Chase"	1:59
17.	"The Dream Fulfilled"	3:23
18.	"Panda Face Fritters"	2:51
19.	"Poor Defenseless Me"	4:28
20.	"Unpardoned"	4:37
Total length:		51:04

== Featured musicians ==
Credits adapted from liner notes:

- Accordion – Eddie Hession
- Alto and piccolo flute – Anna Noakes
- Bass – Allen Walley, Lucy Hare, Markus Van Horn, Paul Kimber, Richard Pryce, Steve Mair, Steve Rossell, Mary Scully
- Bass clarinet – Anthony Pike
- Bass trombone – Richard Edwards, Andy Wood
- Bassoon – Stephen Maw, Richard Skinner
- Celesta – John Lenehan
- Cello – Caroline Dale, Dave Daniels, Frank Schaefer, Jackie Thomas, Jo Knight, John Heley, Lionel Handy, Martin Loveday, Robin Firman, Steve Orton, Tony Lewis,Anthony Pleeth
- Choir – London Voices
- Clarinet – Nicholas Bucknall
- Contrabass clarinet – Dave Fuest
- Contrabassoon – David Chatterton
- Cor anglais – Jane Marshall
- Drums – Stephen Hodges
- Flute – Eliza Marshall, Karen Jones
- French horn – John Ryan, John Thurgood, Mark Wood, Martin Owen, Mike Thompson, Richard Watkins
- Harp – Skaila Kanga
- Oboe – Matthew Draper, David Theodore, Jane Marshall
- Percussion – Gary Kettel, Sam Walton, Frank Ricotti
- Piano – Dave Hartley
- Taiko – Paul Clarvis, Sam Walton, Frank Ricotti
- Tenor trombone – Dudley Bright, Lindsay Shilling
- Timpani – Bill Lockhart
- Trumpet – John Barclay, Kate Moore, Paul Mayes, Phil Cobb
- Tuba – Oren Marshall
- Viola – Andy Parker, Bill Hawkes, Bob Smissen, Bruce White, Chris Pitsillides, Clare Finnimore, Don McVay, Ian Rathbone, Kate Musker, Rachel Bolt, Rachel Robson, Vicci Wardman
- Violin – Alison Dods, Alison Kelly, Bea Lovejoy, Boguslaw Kostecki, Cathy Thompson, Chris Tombling, David Ogden, Dave Woodcock, Debbie Preece, Debbie Widdup, Emil Chakalov, Eos Chater, Everton Nelson, Gillian Findlay, Ian Humphries, Jim McLeod, Jonathan Evans-Jones, Julian Leaper, Mark Berrow, Oli Langford, Patrick Kiernan, Paul Willey, Pauline Lowbury, Perry Montague-Mason, Philippe Honoré, Robin Brightman, Sonia Slany, Thomas Gould, Tom Pigott-Smith, Thomas Bowes, Emlyn Singleton
