= Sony's Spider-Man Universe =

Superhero media franchise

- Based on: Marvel Comics
- Produced by: Avi Arad; Matt Tolmach; Amy Pascal
- Starring: See below
- Production companies: Columbia Pictures; Marvel Entertainment; Arad Productions; Matt Tolmach Productions; Pascal Pictures; Bohemian Risk Productions (Spider-Noir); Oren (Spider-Noir); Amazon MGM Studios (Spider-Noir); Sony Pictures Television (Spider-Noir)
- Distributed by: Sony Pictures Releasing
- Release date: 2018–present
- Country: United States
- Language: English
- Budget: $595–639 million (6 films)
- Box office: $2.17 billion (6 films)

Sony's Spider-Man Universe (SSU) is an American media franchise and shared universe centered on a series of superhero films produced by Columbia Pictures in association with Marvel Entertainment. Distributed by Sony Pictures Releasing, the films are based on various Marvel Comics characters and properties associated with the character Spider-Man, who is not prominently featured in the franchise. Unlike other shared universes that establish crossovers between entries, the films in the SSU are loosely connected, with greater emphasis on standalone storytelling over interconnectivity.

Sony Pictures, which owns the film rights to Spider-Man, began developing an expanded universe featuring supporting characters from the Spider-Man films by December 2013. The studio planned to use The Amazing Spider-Man 2 (2014) to launch several spin-off films focused on Spider-Man villains from the comics, including a Venom film. After the relative critical and financial disappointment of The Amazing Spider-Man 2, these plans were abandoned, and in February 2015, Sony announced a deal to collaborate with Marvel Studios on future Spider-Man films and integrate the character into the Marvel Cinematic Universe (MCU). This relationship produced Spider-Man: Homecoming (2017), Spider-Man: Far From Home (2019), Spider-Man: No Way Home (2021), and Spider-Man: Brand New Day (2026), while Sony separately re-developed Venom (2018) as a stand-alone film with its own fictional universe. Sony and Marvel Studios renegotiated their deal in 2019 to share the Spider-Man character between the MCU and their standalone Marvel-based films.

Venom was followed by Venom: Let There Be Carnage (2021) and Morbius (2022), both of which have mid-credits scenes that feature elements from the multiverse concept to link the SSU with the MCU, while Sony's animated Spider-Verse series (2023) is also connected to the SSU. These were followed by Madame Web, Venom: The Last Dance, and Kraven the Hunter in 2024, which all feature additional characters related to Spider-Man in the comics. Morbius, Madame Web, and Kraven the Hunter received negative reviews and were commercial failures, while the Venom films received mixed reviews and were commercially successful. The franchise has grossed over $2 billion worldwide. By the end of 2024, Sony stopped developing further standalone films to focus on its other Spider-Man properties, such as the live-action Sony Pictures Television series Spider-Noir (2026), which is part of the franchise but set in an alternate universe.

== Name ==
Sony officially announced their new shared universe—based on various Marvel Comics properties and characters commonly associated with Spider-Man—in May 2017, with the title "Sony's Marvel Universe". By August 2018, it was being referred to as "Sony's Universe of Marvel Characters" internally at the company. In March 2019, a Sony Pictures Entertainment presentation referred to the "Sony Pictures Universe of Marvel Characters" (SPUMC), and Sony later confirmed that this was the official name for its shared universe. The presentation applied the title to Marvel Studios' Spider-Man films and the animated Spider-Verse films as well as Sony's own live-action Marvel adaptations. The title was widely criticized, with commentators mocking its length compared to shorter franchise names like the Marvel Cinematic Universe (MCU) and DC Extended Universe (DCEU), as well as the acronym "SPUMC". James Whitbrook of io9 questioned why the term "Spider-Verse" was not being used. Columbia Pictures president Sanford Panitch stated that Sony did not want to refer to their shared universe as the "Spider-Verse" since it encompassed many characters separate from Spider-Man. Despite this, Sony announced in August 2021 that the franchise had been renamed "Sony's Spider-Man Universe" (SSU).

== Development ==
=== Background ===
In January 2010, Sony Pictures announced that the Spider-Man film franchise would be rebooted after director Sam Raimi decided to no longer continue his version of the franchise. By March 2012, Sony was still interested in a spin-off film they had been developing centered on the character Venom, looking to capitalize on the release of the first reboot film, The Amazing Spider-Man (2012). That June, producers Avi Arad and Matt Tolmach discussed Venom and The Amazing Spider-Man in reference to the Marvel Cinematic Universe (MCU) and how the different franchises set in that world crossed over with The Avengers (2012). Tolmach stated, "Hopefully all these worlds will live together in peace someday." In December 2013, Sony revealed plans to use The Amazing Spider-Man 2 (2014) to establish their own expanded universe based on the Marvel properties the studio had the film rights to, including Venom. Arad and Tolmach would produce the films as part of a franchise brain trust that also included Alex Kurtzman, Roberto Orci, Jeff Pinkner, Ed Solomon, and Drew Goddard, and The Amazing Spider-Man and The Amazing Spider-Man 2 director Marc Webb. However, after The Amazing Spider-Man 2 underperformed and with Sony "under tremendous pressure to perform", the direction of the new shared universe was rethought.

Following the November 2014 hacking of Sony's computers, emails between Sony Pictures Entertainment co-chairman Amy Pascal and president Doug Belgrad were released, stating that Sony was planning to "rejuvenate" the Spider-Man franchise by developing an animated comedy film with Phil Lord and Christopher Miller. Sony executives were set to discuss the project further at a January 2015 summit regarding several Spider-Man spin-off films. In February 2015, Sony, Disney and Marvel Studios announced a new partnership that would see the latter produce the next Spider-Man film for Sony, and integrate the character into the Marvel Cinematic Universe (MCU). Sony still planned to produce the spin-off films without Marvel's involvement, but these were believed to have been "scrapped" by November, with Sony instead focusing on its new reboot with Marvel. Discussing the animated film during that year, Sony Pictures chairman Tom Rothman said it would "co-exist" with the live-action Spider-Man films, though Sony stated it would "exist independently of the projects in the live-action Spider-Man universe." The animated film Spider-Man: Into the Spider-Verse (2018) is set in an alternate universe from the Marvel Spider-Man reboot, but introduces the comic-based concept of the "Spider-Verse" multiverse, in which different incarnations of Spider-Man can be brought together; Sony was excited by the possibility of crossovers between the live-action and animated films after seeing the quality of Into the Spider-Verse. In June 2022, Lord and Miller said that Sony intended for their Spider-Man Universe and the Spider-Verse films to connect to the MCU via the multiverse. In Spider-Man: Across the Spider-Verse (2023), the sequel to Into the Spider-Verse, the character the Spot visits Mrs. Chen (played by Peggy Lu, reprising her role from the Venom films), during which Sony's Spider-Man Universe is referred to as "Earth-688".

=== Sony's shared universe ===
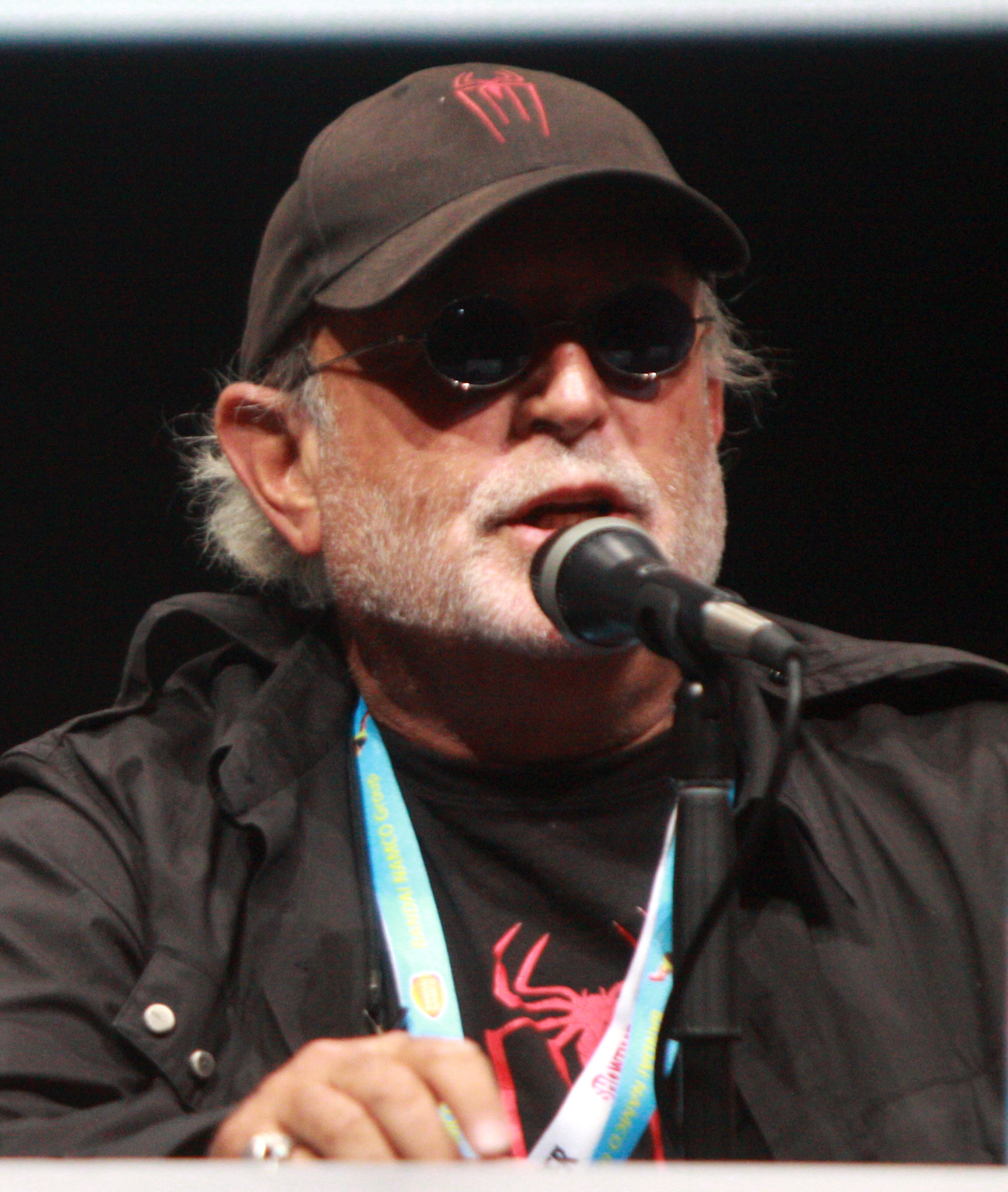
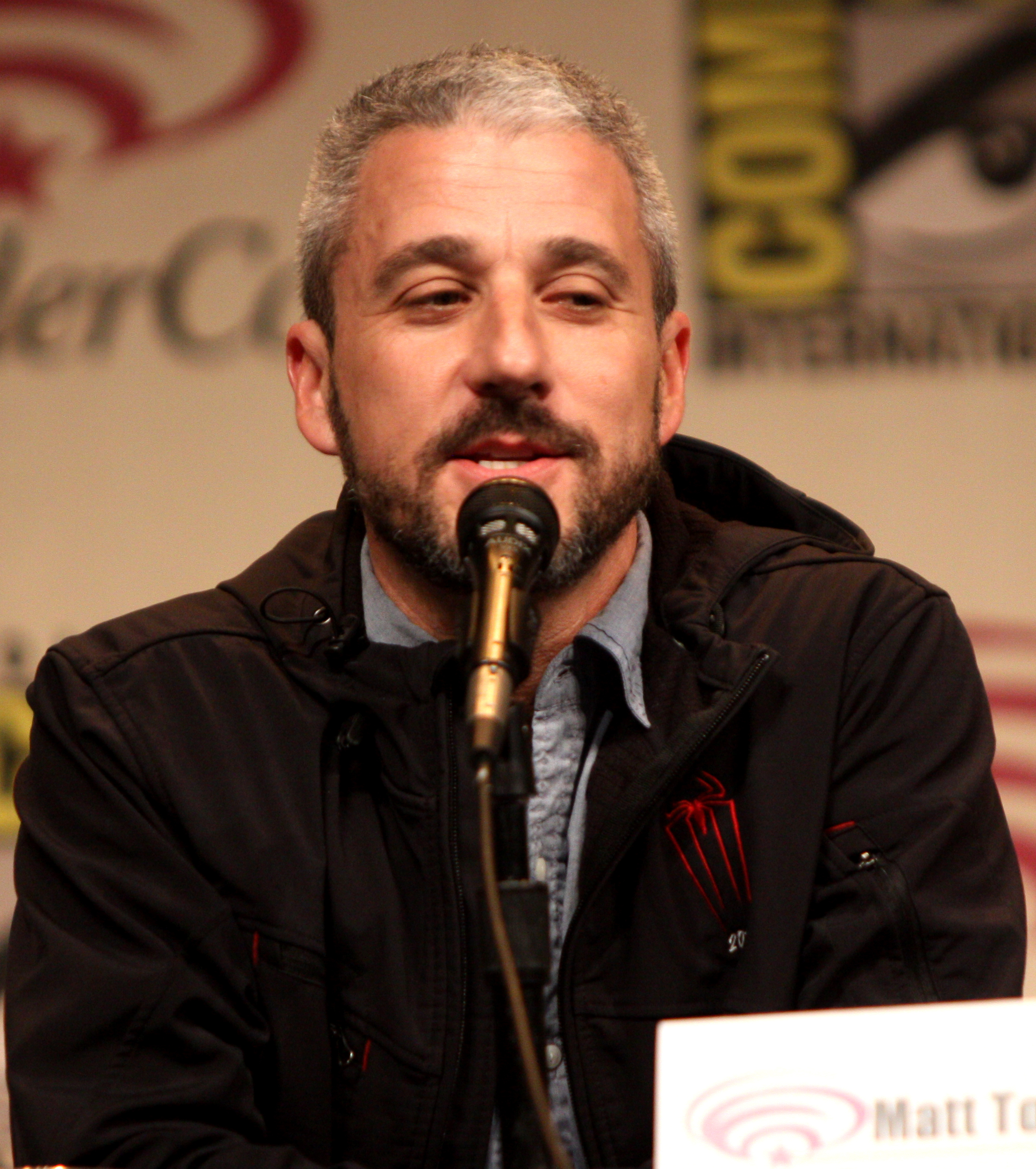
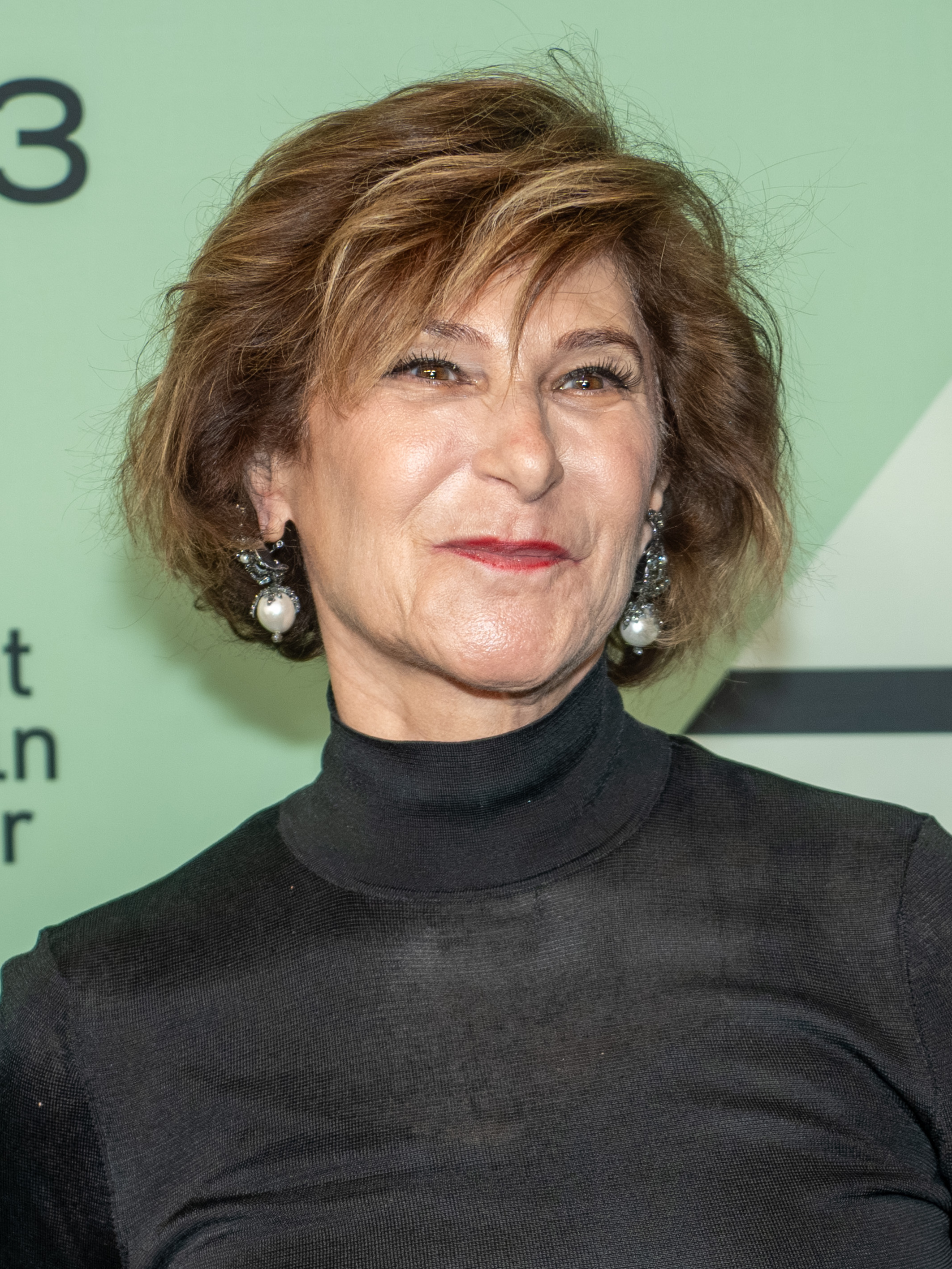
Spider-Man film producers Avi Arad, Matt Tolmach, and Amy Pascal are frequent producers of Sony's shared universe.

Venom was revived by Sony in March 2016, envisioned as a standalone film unrelated to Sony and Marvel's new Spider-Man films, which would launch its own franchise and shared universe. In May 2017, Sony confirmed that Venom was not considered a spin-off of any other film, and would officially begin its own shared universe. Sony was looking to build out this new universe gradually rather than rush in as they had previously tried with the Amazing Spider-Man spin-offs. In July, Columbia Pictures president Sanford Panitch explained that they were looking to "do what's the absolute best for each individual property. I just want to honor the original DNA." Because of this, Sony hoped that individual filmmakers would give each film its own distinct style rather than having a single person in charge of the universe, as with the MCU's Kevin Feige. The studio also wanted to avoid "conventional comic-book movies", with the intention of dealing in different genres such as horror or comedy, potential R-rated films, and even lower-than-usual budgets, depending on each project.

By March 2018, Sony's executive vice president, Palak Patel, was overseeing all of the universe's films. In July, Vulture interviewed several creatives involved in the universe to try to alleviate the fears of some fans concerning Sony's plans. Jonathan Goldstein—co-writer of the first MCU Spider-Man film, Spider-Man: Homecoming (2017)—said the future of the universe would be decided by the success of Venom, and noted that other studios had struggled to replicate Marvel Studios' MCU success. Brian Michael Bendis, comic creator of many Marvel characters that Sony planned to add to its universe, consulted on Into the Spider-Verse and was aware of Sony's plans for its shared universe. He described them as "very cool. Fans wouldn't be annoyed with what they're doing." He added that MCU films such as Iron Man (2008) and Guardians of the Galaxy (2014), which he was also involved in, were considered risks due to the lack of familiarity that general audiences had with those properties, but they both went on to be successful. He said this could also happen to lesser-known Spider-Man characters. In August, Sony was confirmed to have the rights to 900 Marvel Comics characters, and Panitch explained that "Spider-Man connects to a lot of the characters. There are villains, heroes, and antiheroes, and a lot are female characters, many of whom are bona fide, fully dimensionalized, and utterly unique. We feel there's no reason the Marvel characters shouldn't be able to embrace diversity." When asked whether Venom would act as the "common thread" throughout the shared universe, Sony said this was not necessarily the case as they wanted Venom to be standalone, but said Venom would have "key points of intersection" with other films.

Following the successful release of Venom, Pascal said some of Sony's "previously shelved plans" could now come to fruition, including a crossover based on the villainous Sinister Six team. In March 2019, Sony Pictures Entertainment chairman Tony Vinciquerra said the "next seven or eight years" of the shared universe had been planned. There was some hesitancy within Sony to establish interconnection between its films in the shared universe after previous attempts fell through, but the studio ultimately opted to de-emphasize the interconnected nature of its films by telling self-contained stories focused on supporting characters related to Spider-Man. After the franchise's 2024 films Madame Web and Kraven the Hunter performed poorly at the box office, Sony was reported in December 2024 to no longer be developing further films for its franchise at that time, and was instead focusing on the MCU film Spider-Man: Brand New Day (2026), the animated Spider-Man: Beyond the Spider-Verse (2027), and the SSU television series Spider-Noir (2026). A subsequent Variety report noted that Sony had privately acknowledged that Kraven the Hunter, Madame Web, and fellow SSU film Morbius (2022) were creative and critical failures and that they needed to re-evaluate which Spider-Man characters were given their own film franchises. Variety stated that while Sony had not technically established an official shared universe because it did not connect their narratives, the studio was not likely to stop making films for other characters, such as Venom, which were successful. In February 2026, Rothman confirmed that Sony planned to continue its franchise through a "fresh reboot" overseen by different individuals. At that time, Sony Pictures Animation was developing an animated Venom film to be directed by Zach Lipovsky and Adam B. Stein, with Hardy creatively involved. In August 2026, Rothman confirmed that no other films based on Spider-Man characters were in active development, noting the studio had not viewed the films it had made as a "Sony-Marvel Universe", but rather feeling they were "worthwhile movies to make with other characters".

=== Marvel Cinematic Universe connections ===
Feige stated in June 2017 that because Venom was solely a Sony project, Marvel Studios had no plans to have it crossover with the MCU. However, producer Amy Pascal soon clarified that Sony intended to have their new Marvel-based films take place in "the same world" as Spider-Man: Homecoming, describing them as "adjunct" to that world. She said that Venom would have connections with the next planned film in Sony's shared universe, Silver & Black, and that there was potential for Tom Holland's Spider-Man to crossover from the MCU films to the films in Sony's universe. Holland was not contracted to appear outside of a trilogy of Spider-Man films and several other MCU films, but Sony intended to have the actor appear in their other Marvel films eventually. According to several reports, Holland spent several days during Venom's production filming a cameo appearance as Peter Parker / Spider-Man for the film, but Marvel Studios asked Sony to exclude the scene from the final film. By August 2018, Sony was actively planning to crossover Spider-Man with their own Marvel films, describing the character and Venom as "already in the same universe... we are looking forward to the two of them eventually facing off in the future". Sony was also open to more of their characters appearing in MCU films in exchange for more MCU characters appearing in their own films. In December, Venom writer Jeff Pinkner was asked if that film was set in the same universe as Holland's Spider-Man films, and he said, "without revealing anything that I'm not allowed to reveal, it is not impossible that in a future/upcoming Venom movie, Spider-Man will play a significant role". Pascal added, in reference to a crossover between the MCU Spider-Man films, Sony's own shared universe films, and Sony's animated Spider-Verse films, that "there's a world in which everything comes together", but Holland was restricted by his contract with Marvel Studios at that time.

By August 2019, Marvel Studios and the Walt Disney Company had spent several months discussing expanding their deal with Sony, with the latter seeking to include more films than originally agreed while keeping the same terms of the original agreement. Disney expressed concern with Feige's workload producing the non-Spider-Man MCU films already, and asked for a 25–50% stake in any future films Feige produces for Sony. Unable to agree, Sony announced that it would be moving forward on the next Spider-Man film without Feige or Marvel. They acknowledged that this could change in the future, thanked Feige for his work on Homecoming and Spider-Man: Far From Home (2019), and stated that they appreciated "the path [Feige] has helped put us on, which we will continue". The Hollywood Reporter added that the end of the studios' agreement "almost certainly" meant that Holland's Spider-Man would no longer appear in MCU films, but "significantly increased" the chances of the character crossing over with the rest of Sony's own Marvel films such as the Venom franchise and the then-in-production Morbius. In September, Vinciquerra stated that "for the moment the door is closed" on Spider-Man returning to the MCU, and confirmed that the character would be integrated with Sony's own shared universe moving forward, saying "he will play off the other characters" that the studio owns the rights to. In response to backlash from fans following the announcement, Vinciquerra added that "the Marvel people are terrific people, we have great respect for them, but on the other hand we have some pretty terrific people of our own. Kevin didn't do all the work... we're pretty capable of doing what we have to do here."

Following a negative fan reaction at Disney's biennial D23 Expo, and at the urging of Holland who personally spoke to Rothman and Disney CEO Bob Iger, Disney returned to negotiations with Sony. Later that September, Sony and Disney announced a new agreement that would allow Marvel Studios and Feige to produce a third MCU Spider-Man film for Sony. Disney was reported to be co-financing 25% of the film in exchange for 25% of the film's profits while retaining the merchandising rights to the character. The agreement also allowed Holland's Spider-Man to appear in a future Marvel Studios film, while Feige stated that moving forward the MCU's Spider-Man would be able to "cross cinematic universes" and appear in Sony's own shared universe as well. This interaction was said to be a "'call and answer' between the two franchises as they acknowledge details between the two in what would loosely be described as a shared detailed universe". Sony described their previous films with Marvel Studios as a "great collaboration", and said "our mutual desire to continue was equal to that of the many fans". Panitch acknowledged in May 2021 that there had been confusion and frustration from fans regarding the relationship between the two universes, but said there was a plan to clarify this and he believed it was already "getting a little more clear for people [as to] where we're headed" at that time. He added that the release of Spider-Man: No Way Home (2021), which explores the multiverse, would reveal more of this plan.

In No Way Home, Doctor Strange casts two spells: one that brings characters from other universes into the MCU, and one that sends them back to their own universes. The mid-credits scene of Venom: Let There Be Carnage (2021) shows Venom being transported into the MCU from his universe by the first spell, and the mid-credits scene of No Way Home shows Venom being transported back to his own universe by the second spell. A small part of the Venom symbiote is left in the MCU. Feige said there was significant coordination between the Let There Be Carnage and No Way Home teams to create the two scenes, with No Way Home director Jon Watts directing both scenes during production of that film. In the mid-credits scenes of Morbius, taking place simultaneously with the events of No Way Home, Adrian Toomes / Vulture is revealed to have been transported to the SSU by the same spell, meeting with Morbius in an effort to form a team. This scene was filmed during reshoots to explain how Keaton's Toomes could be interacting with Morbius, a non-MCU character. Sony was forced to adjust these plans after the film—which was originally completed for an initial 2020 release before several multiverse-focused MCU projects like No Way Home—was delayed due to the COVID-19 pandemic until after No Way Home. In June 2022, Lord and Miller said that Sony intended for the SSU and the Spider-Verse films to connect to the MCU via the multiverse.

Holland ultimately did not appear in any SSU film by the end of 2024, which Adam B. Vary at Variety reported had caused concerns about the quality control of Sony's films and whether the spin-off films were opportunistic yet cynical products. Vary further reported that while the deal between Sony and Disney for the Spider-Man film rights did not prevent the character from appearing in non-Spider-Man titled films, there was some concern from Sony executives that audiences would not be receptive to Holland's Spider-Man appearing in a non-MCU film, particularly after some MCU films like No Way Home and Doctor Strange in the Multiverse of Madness (2022) further established creative possibilities and boundaries with the multiverse. In March 2025, Hardy said a crossover between his Venom and Holland's Spider-Man had been discussed beyond his appearance in No Way Home, but this did not eventuate and was never in development as a film. Holland echoed Hardy's comments in July 2026, saying there had been plans to merge the SSU with the MCU, but Sony never found the proper time to attempt that. Holland added that Rothman saw the success of the MCU films and decided for Marvel Studios to "continue on our path" with the character.

=== Expansion to television ===
Vinciquerra stated in March 2019 that the universe would be expanding to television with a set of Marvel projects developed specifically by Sony Pictures Television. At the time, the studio was "essentially internally auditioning" characters from the 900 it could access to decide which medium they would appear in, with Sony Pictures Television chairman Mike Hopkins describing their progress in selecting characters for television as "pretty far down the road". Hopkins elaborated that Sony planned to have several series set in the shared universe that could "pollinate between each other", and that a yet-to-be-determined network partner would release them. An announcement of this partner was expected within the next few months, with the networks owned by Marvel's parent Disney—including their new streaming service Disney+—being considered alongside others. These television plans were attributed to the success of Venom and Into the Spider-Verse, which "bolstered confidence that there's an appetite for Sony's slice of Marvel".

After their work on Into the Spider-Verse, Lord and Miller signed an overall deal with Sony Pictures Television in April 2019 to develop multiple television series for the studio, including their Marvel-based series, which could potentially include characters from Into the Spider-Verse as well as live-action properties. Select projects would be produced in conjunction with Pascal. Discussing these series in August, Miller could not update where or when the series would be released but said there would be several live-action series and they would each be a unique experience with connections to the others. The next month, Vinciquerra said there were five or six individual series in development for the universe. By January 2020, one of these series was believed to be a version of Silver & Black after development on that film was canceled in August 2018. Gina Prince-Bythewood, who co-wrote and was going to direct the film version before it was canceled, confirmed in April 2020 that Silver & Black was being re-developed for television. She suggested that it could be a limited series, and had the potential to be released on Disney+. That June, former Marvel Television and Marvel Studios television executive Karim Zreik was made head of television for Lord and Miller, putting him in charge of all their planned series, including the Marvel-based ones. The latter were described as a priority for Sony Pictures Television, and Zreik's experience with previous Marvel television series made him a "suitable partner" for planning them.

By September 2020, Sony was in talks with Amazon Prime Video for the latter to be the streaming distributor for Sony's "suite" of Marvel-based television series, similar to Marvel Television's group of series that streamed on Netflix. The negotiations with Amazon were said to be complex, with "major issues that need to be resolved" stemming from the complex distribution rights for the various characters. The series were expected to be released on a traditional television platform before moving to streaming. By then, the first series intended to be part of this deal was one focused on the character Silk, who had been identified as a good candidate for a series after a film was in development. Amazon was confirmed at the end of April 2021 to have the rights to stream the upcoming series on Prime Video. In November 2022, the series were set to debut on the television network MGM+ before streaming on Prime Video. The Silk series was titled Silk: Spider Society when it was being re-developed, while a series centered on the character Spider-Man Noir was revealed to be in development in February 2023 for Amazon.

The writers' rooms for Silk: Spider Society and the Spider-Man Noir series were shut down when the Writers Guild of America (WGA) went on strike in May 2023. After the strike ended in late September, Amazon Studios delayed re-opening the writers' room for Spider Society so executives could re-evaluate the series and its already written scripts, and that series was placed on hold by late November. Because of this, staff writers were still contractually obligated to the series without pay but were unable to pursue other opportunities at that time. The WGA threatened to take legal action against Amazon Studios in response. The Ankler reported that it was unclear whether the continued suspension of production was related to the strike or to other production issues. The following month, the writers' room was set to resume work in January 2024, which had the potential to change depending on the script evaluation. In February, The Ankler further reported that, after work resumed for a few weeks, the series had paused the writers' room and let go of several of its members to pursue other opportunities, except for Kang and one of the series' co-executive producers.

Amazon was no longer moving forward with Silk: Spider Society by May 2024, when they instead chose to first proceed with greenlighting the Spider-Man Noir series, titled Spider-Noir. Nicolas Cage, who voiced Spider-Man Noir in Into the Spider-Verse, stars as the character in the series, though he is named Ben Reilly rather than Peter Parker, the identity of Spider-Man Noir in the comics, with the character also known as the Spider; the name change was reported to be because of the character's television rights. Amazon returned the rights to Spider Society to Sony so that the studio could shop it to other potential networks. Amazon remained committed to their Marvel series with Sony, while Kang retained her overall deal with Amazon and was set to continue working on other projects for their studio. The Hollywood Reporter noted it was unclear if Sony could shop the series to Disney, which had previously released several Marvel-based television series. Sony was not expected to renew its deal with Lord and Miller by August 2024 after the duo disagreed with the studio over the budget for Spider-Noir.

Following the cancellation of Spider-Noir in September 2026, it was reported that multiple additional series were being developed between Amazon and Sony Television, with one close to receiving a series order and Amazon hoping to ultimately green-light two of them. These series were being developed by Kelvin Yu; Alison Tatlock; Ben H. Winters; and Ben Nedivi and Matt Wolpert, in collaboration with Megan McDonnell. At the end of the month, Yu's series was reported to be based on the second "Clone Saga" storyline from the comics, with Amazon close to ordering it to series. The series would focus on the Spider-Man clones Ben Reilly and Kaine Parker, though it was unclear at the time if the series would closely adapt the characters and clone storyline from the comics or if there would be significant changes. Yu would also executive produce the series with Pascal, Lord, and Miller.

== Films ==
Released films of Sony's Spider-Man Universe
Film	U.S. release date	Director	Screenwriter(s)	Producer(s)
Venom	October 5, 2018	Ruben Fleischer	Jeff Pinkner & Scott Rosenberg and Kelly Marcel	Avi Arad, Matt Tolmach, and Amy Pascal
Venom: Let There Be Carnage	October 1, 2021	Andy Serkis	Kelly Marcel	Avi Arad, Matt Tolmach, Amy Pascal, Kelly Marcel, Tom Hardy, and Hutch Parker
Morbius	April 1, 2022	Daniel Espinosa	Matt Sazama & Burk Sharpless	Avi Arad, Matt Tolmach, and Lucas Foster
Madame Web	February 14, 2024	S. J. Clarkson	Matt Sazama & Burk Sharpless and Claire Parker & S. J. Clarkson	Lorenzo di Bonaventura
Venom: The Last Dance	October 25, 2024	Kelly Marcel	Kelly Marcel	Avi Arad, Matt Tolmach, Amy Pascal, Kelly Marcel, Tom Hardy, and Hutch Parker
Kraven the Hunter	December 13, 2024	J. C. Chandor	Art Marcum & Matt Holloway and Richard Wenk	Avi Arad, Matt Tolmach, and David Householter

=== Venom (2018) ===
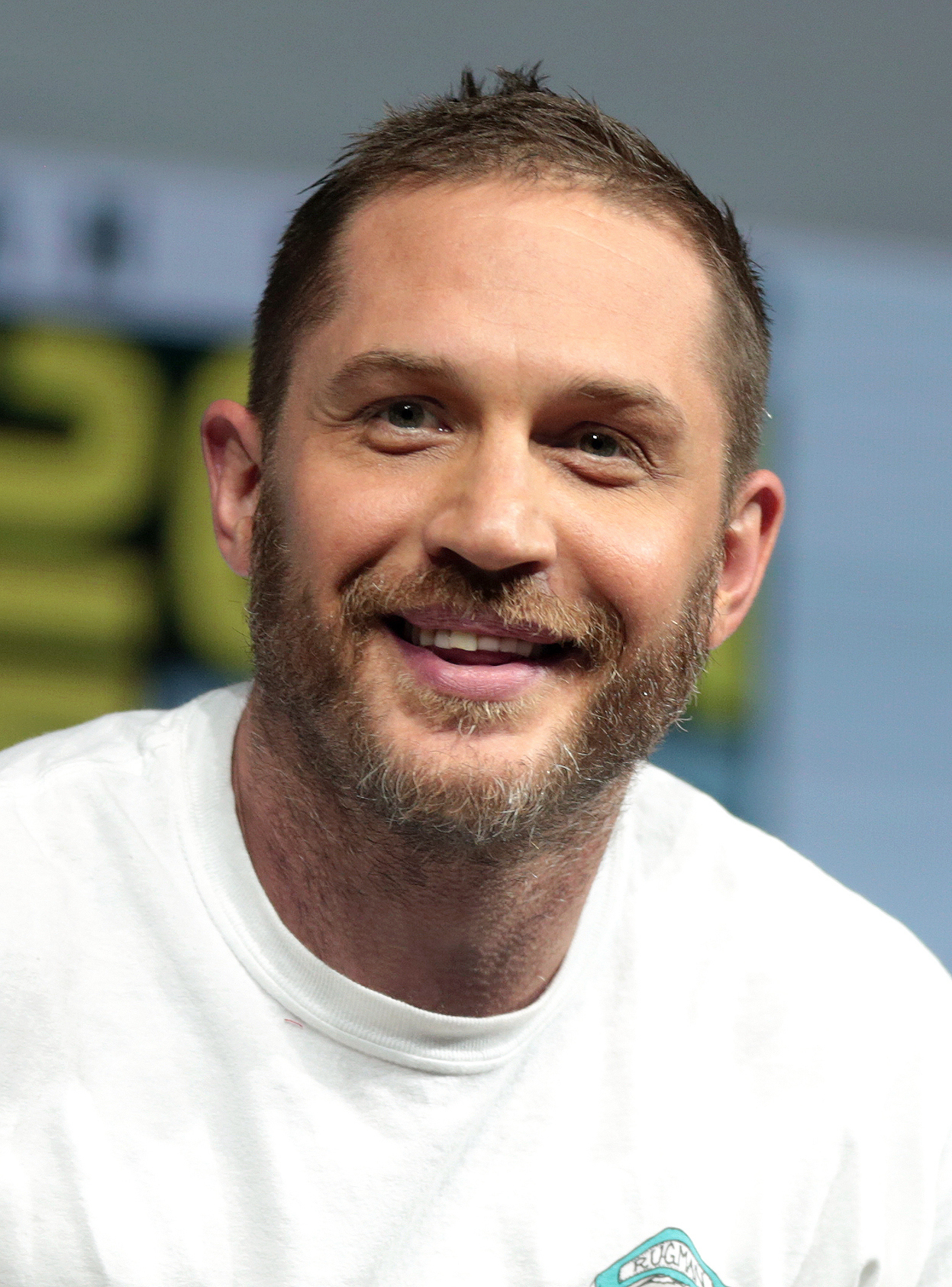
Tom Hardy, star of the Venom trilogy and a producer on the latter two films

Following a scandal, journalist Eddie Brock attempts to revive his career by investigating the Life Foundation, but comes into contact with the alien symbiote Venom that bonds with Brock and gives him superpowers.

Sony revived its long-in-development Venom film in March 2016 as the start of the new shared universe. A year later, Scott Rosenberg and Jeff Pinkner were writing the screenplay. In May 2017, Sony announced that Tom Hardy would star as Eddie Brock / Venom in the film, to be directed by Ruben Fleischer. Kelly Marcel later joined as an additional writer. Filming took place from October 2017 to January 2018, in Atlanta, New York City, and San Francisco. Venom was released on October 5, 2018.

The producers wanted to focus on telling a standalone story with Venom, rather than having it introduce crossover opportunities for future films. However, the film does include a post-credits scene featuring a clip from Sony's Spider-Man: Into the Spider-Verse (2018) that reveals that Venom's universe is part of the Spider-Verse, a shared multiverse. This was added because Sony and the producers of Venom were excited by the possibility of crossovers between the live-action and animated films after seeing the quality of Into the Spider-Verse.

=== Venom: Let There Be Carnage (2021) ===
Eddie Brock continues to rebuild his career by interviewing serial killer Cletus Kasady, who becomes the host of the symbiote Carnage, and escapes prison after a failed execution attempt.

Woody Harrelson appeared as Cletus Kasady at the end of Venom to set up a potential sequel, which was confirmed in January 2019 when writer Marcel and star Hardy were confirmed to return. Fleischer did not return, due to commitments to Zombieland: Double Tap (2019); Andy Serkis was hired as director in August 2019. Filming took place in England from November 2019 to February 2020, with additional filming in San Francisco. Venom: Let There Be Carnage was released on October 1, 2021.

Serkis described Venom: Let There Be Carnage as set in its own world, with its characters unaware of other heroes such as Spider-Man, though the film does include references to the wider Marvel Universe. These include the Daily Bugle newspaper, which has the same title treatment in the film as it did in Sam Raimi's Spider-Man film series. The mid-credits scene transports Brock and Venom to the Marvel Cinematic Universe (MCU) due to the spell cast by Doctor Strange in Spider-Man: No Way Home (2021). Footage of Tom Holland as Peter Parker / Spider-Man and J. K. Simmons as J. Jonah Jameson from the MCU is shown in the scene.

=== Morbius (2022) ===
Suffering from a rare blood disease, Michael Morbius tries a dangerous cure that afflicts him with a form of vampirism, which puts him at odds with his surrogate brother, Lucien / Milo Morbius.

Following a "secret development process" at Sony, Matt Sazama and Burk Sharpless wrote a script for a film based on Morbius, the Living Vampire. By June 2018, Jared Leto was set to star as the title character, with Daniel Espinosa directing the film. Filming began at the end of February 2019, in London, and was confirmed to have completed by June. Morbius was released on April 1, 2022.

The mid-credits scenes of Morbius see Michael Keaton reprising his role as Adrian Toomes / Vulture from Spider-Man: Homecoming (2017), with the character being transported from the MCU to the SSU due to a spell cast by Doctor Strange in Spider-Man: No Way Home. Despite these connections, the producers intended to tell a standalone origin story for Morbius as they did with Venom.

=== Madame Web (2024) ===
Cassandra "Cassie" Webb is forced to confront her past while trying to survive with three young women with powerful futures who are hunted by a deadly adversary.

After their work on Morbius, Sony hired Matt Sazama and Burk Sharpless in September 2019 to write a script centered around Madame Web. In May 2020, S. J. Clarkson was hired to develop and direct Sony's first female-centric Marvel film, which was reported to be the Madame Web film. The studio was looking to attach a prominent actress such as Charlize Theron or Amy Adams to the project, before hiring a new writer to craft the film with an actress in mind. By February 2022, Dakota Johnson was in talks to portray the lead character, and was confirmed to be starring that April. Filming began in mid-July, occurring in Boston and throughout Massachusetts until that September, before shooting in New York City by mid-October. Filming completed before the end of 2022. Clarkson also served as the film's credited writer for the screenplay along with Sazama, Sharpless, and Claire Parker. Madame Web was released on February 14, 2024.

Madame Web is set in 2003, and features Emma Roberts and Adam Scott as Mary and Ben Parker. Mary Parker is pregnant in the film, which depicts the birth of Peter Parker.

=== Venom: The Last Dance (2024) ===
Eddie Brock and Venom go on the run when they are hunted by both of their worlds.

In August 2018, Hardy confirmed that he had signed on to star in three Venom films. Andy Serkis expressed interest in returning to direct another Venom film in September 2021, and that December, Pascal said they were in the "planning stages" of a third Venom film. Sony confirmed the film was in development at CinemaCon in April 2022. In June, Hardy revealed that Kelly Marcel was writing the script and that he was co-writing the story with her, and Marcel was set to direct that October. Filming began in late June 2023 in Spain, but was halted the next month due to the 2023 SAG-AFTRA strike. Filming resumed in November following the strike's conclusion, and was nearly completed by February 2024. The title was revealed the following month. Venom: The Last Dance was released on October 25, 2024.

Venom: The Last Dance continues directly from the post-credits scene of Spider-Man: No Way Home, where Eddie and Venom return from the MCU to the SSU, with Cristo Fernández reprising his role as a bartender, while also portraying his version from the SSU. Reid Scott, who previously portrayed Dr. Dan Lewis in the first two Venom films, voices the head of Imperium. Serkis portrays the character Knull, the creator of the symbiotes, in the film. Marcel said that while The Last Dance concludes the story arc of Eddie and Venom, it sets up Knull for future appearances within the SSU and is the beginning of that character's story.

=== Kraven the Hunter (2024) ===
Kraven has a complex relationship with his father, which sets him on a path of vengeance and motivates him to become the greatest and most feared hunter.

Richard Wenk was hired to write a screenplay based on Kraven the Hunter in August 2018. Art Marcum and Matt Holloway had re-written the script by August 2020, and J. C. Chandor entered talks to direct; he was confirmed in May 2021 when Aaron Taylor-Johnson was cast in the title role. Filming began in late March 2022 in London, and concluded by mid-June. Kraven the Hunter was released on December 13, 2024.

=== Unproduced films ===
The following are feature films that were in development but did not materialize:

- The Sinister Six: Sony's December 2013 plans for their own The Amazing Spider-Man shared universe included a film based on the Sinister Six group of Spider-Man villains, with Drew Goddard attached to write. He was confirmed to also be directing the film in April 2014, but it was believed to have been canceled by November 2015 when Sony was focusing on its new reboot with Marvel Studios. Pascal said the film was "alive" again in December 2018 following the success of Venom, and she was waiting for Goddard to be ready to direct it before moving forward with the project.
- Nightwatch: By September 2017, Sony was actively developing a film based on the character Nightwatch, with a script from Edward Ricourt. Sony wanted Spike Lee to direct the film, and he was confirmed to be interested in the project in March 2018, with Cheo Hodari Coker re-writing the script. Lee was no longer involved by October.
- Jackpot: By August 2018, Sony was considering a film centered on the character Jackpot and was actively looking for a writer. Marc Guggenheim, a writer on the Jackpot comic books, was revealed to be writing the screenplay for Jackpot in May 2020, though he had been working on the film for two years already by that point.
- Untitled Roberto Orci project: In March 2020, Sony hired The Amazing Spider-Man 2 co-writer Roberto Orci to write the script for an untitled Marvel film that would be set in Sony's shared universe. The plot was intended to be based on a property from a "different corner of the Marvel universe that Sony has access to" rather than on a character affiliated with Spider-Man, as in Sony's other Marvel films.
- Untitled Olivia Wilde project: In August 2020, Olivia Wilde signed on to develop and direct a female-centric Marvel film for Sony with her writing partner Katie Silberman. The project had been a high priority at the studio since early 2020, and was believed to feature the character Spider-Woman.
- El Muerto: After Sony executives were impressed by the performance of singer Bad Bunny in the studio's film Bullet Train (2022), they became interested in having him star in another high-profile film. They settled on the minor Spider-Man-related character El Muerto, a wrestler who has superhuman strength, and looked to move quickly on the project. Bad Bunny made a "surprise appearance" at Sony's CinemaCon panel in April 2022 to announce the film, with a scheduled release date of January 12, 2024. In October, Jonás Cuarón and Gareth Dunnet-Alcocer were hired to respectively direct and write the film. Bad Bunny said in March 2023 that the film had yet to enter production, with his publicist confirming that it was "at a standstill" but still "in development". The film was pulled from Sony's release schedule in June due to Bad Bunny's touring schedule and the 2023 Writers Guild of America strike, and Bad Bunny was no longer involved by that July. The film re-entered development by January 2024 after further revisions to the script, with Sony intending for it to be a standalone film similar to their other SSU films.
- Hypno-Hustler film: In December 2022, Sony was revealed to be developing a film centered on the character Hypno-Hustler, with Donald Glover set to star and produce, and Myles Murphy set to write. Glover previously portrayed Aaron Davis in Spider-Man: Homecoming, and made a live-action cameo appearance in the animated Spider-Man: Across the Spider-Verse as a version of Aaron Davis / Prowler.
- Other projects: Sony was considering a film centered around Mysterio by June 2017, with Jake Gyllenhaal cast in the role for Far From Home. In December 2018, a spin-off film from the MCU Spider-Man films or the animated Spider-Verse films starring Spider-Man's Aunt May was suggested, a notion that Sony previously referred to as "silly".

== Television series ==
Sony's Spider-Man Universe television series
Series	Season	Episodes	Originally released	Network	Showrunners	Status
Spider-Noir	1	8	May 25, 2026	MGM+	Oren Uziel and Steve Lightfoot	Concluded

=== Spider-Noir (2026) ===
Spider-Noir follows Ben Reilly, an aging, down on his luck private investigator, who grapples with his past life as the only superhero in 1930s New York City, the Spider. When an exceptional case comes his way, Reilly must become the Spider once more.

In February 2023, a television series based on the character Spider-Man Noir entered development from Sony and Amazon, with Oren Uziel writing the series and executive producing with Pascal, Lord, and Miller. Development was put on hold in May by the writers' strike and was set to resume after it ended. Lord and Miller said there was potential for Nicolas Cage to portray the titular role in the series after he previously voiced the character in Into the Spider-Verse. In December, Steve Lightfoot was hired to serve as co-showrunner and executive producer alongside Uziel, and Cage was in talks for the title role by February 2024. The series was officially ordered and titled Noir in May 2024, when Cage's casting was confirmed and Harry Bradbeer joined to direct and executive produce the first two episodes. That July, the series was retitled Spider-Noir to better highlight its connections to the Spider-Man universe. Cage portrays Ben Reilly rather than Peter Parker, the identity of Spider-Man Noir in the comics, with the character also known as the Spider. Filming took place in Los Angeles from August 2024 to March 2025. Spider-Noir had its world premiere on May 13, 2026, at the Regal Times Square in New York City, and was released in its entirety on May 25, 2026, on MGM+ in the United States, and consists of eight episodes. All episodes were released globally on Prime Video on May 27. In September 2026, the series was cancelled after one season.

Spider-Noir is set in an alternate universe based on 1930s New York City.

=== Unproduced series ===
The following are television series that were in development but did not materialize:

- Silk: Spider Society: By the end of June 2018, Sony and Amy Pascal had begun development on a film centered on the character Cindy Moon / Silk portrayed by Tiffany Espensen in the Marvel Cinematic Universe, which would be distinct from the version appearing in Sony's animated Spider-Women film. In late 2019, Silk was identified as a good candidate for a television series, and development on the series version began with Pascal remaining as producer. In September 2020, Lauren Moon was writing and developing the series. In November 2022, the series was titled Silk: Spider Society, when Angela Kang joined to re-develop the series and serve as its showrunner and an executive producer alongside Pascal and the duo of Phil Lord and Christopher Miller. The series was set to follow Cindy Moon as she escapes imprisonment after being bitten by a radioactive spider, and is in search of her missing family. Production was suspended by the 2023 Writers Guild of America strike that May, and by February 2024, it was being re-developed for a more "male-skewing" audience while the writers' room was paused. However, Amazon chose to no longer move forward with the series in May after requesting it to focus less heavily on Silk, and returned the rights to Sony so the studio could shop the series to other networks.
- Silver & Black: Sony canceled its planned female team-up film Silver & Black in August 2018 with the intention of reworking it as two separate solo films focusing on each of the title characters—Felicia Hardy / Black Cat and Silver Sable. Silver & Black's director Gina Prince-Bythewood was expected to remain involved as a producer. By January 2020, the project was being re-developed as a television series, which Prince-Bythewood confirmed that April. She suggested that it could be a limited series.

== Other media ==
=== Comics ===
A comic book tie-in to Venom, serving as both a prequel and a teaser for the film, was released digitally by Marvel on September 14, 2018, with a physical version available to those who purchased tickets for the film from AMC Theatres. Written by Sean Ryan and illustrated by Szymon Kudranski, the comic establishes the film's backstory for the symbiote. SKAN provided the cover art for the comic.

A comic book tie-in to Spider-Noir, serving as a prequel to the series, was released in May.

=== Digital series ===
In March 2022, Sony promoted Morbius with the third season of their promotional web series The Daily Bugle to TikTok, which had been previously used to promote Far From Home and No Way Home. The videos feature TikToker Nicque Marina as a fictionalized version of herself, reporting on events related to the events of Morbius.

== Cast and characters ==
List indicators

This section includes characters who will appear or have appeared in noteworthy roles.

- An empty grey cell indicates the character was not in the film, or that the character's official presence has not yet been confirmed.
- ^{A} indicates an appearance through archival footage or audio.
- ^{C} indicates a cameo role.
- ^{E} indicates an appearance not included in the theatrical cut.
- ^{P} indicates an appearance in onscreen photographs.
- ^{V} indicates a voice-only role.
- ^{Y} indicates a younger version of the character.

Character	Films						Television series	Digital series
Character	Venom	Venom: Let There Be Carnage	Morbius	Madame Web	Venom: The Last Dance	Kraven the Hunter	Spider-Noir	The Daily Bugle season 3
Introduced in the Marvel Cinematic Universe
J. Jonah Jameson		J. K. Simmons^{C}	J. K. Simmons^{E}					
Peter Parker Spider-Man		Tom Holland^{C}						
Adrian Toomes Vulture			Michael Keaton^{C}					
Bartender					Cristo Fernández (Note: Fernández reprises his role as the bartender he portrayed in the MCU film Spider-Man: No Way Home in addition to playing the SSU version of the character.)			
Introduced in Venom
Eddie Brock Venom	Tom Hardy	Tom Hardy			Tom Hardy			
Mrs. Chen	Peggy Lu	Peggy Lu			Peggy Lu			
Carlton Drake Riot	Riz Ahmed				Riz Ahmed^{A}			
Cletus Kasady Carnage	Woody Harrelson^{C}	Woody Harrelson Jack Bandeira^{Y}			Woody Harrelson^{A}			
Dan Lewis	Reid Scott	Reid Scott			Reid Scott^{E}			
Dora Skirth	Jenny Slate							
Roland Treece	Scott Haze							
Anne Weying	Michelle Williams	Michelle Williams						
Introduced in Venom: Let There Be Carnage
Frances Barrison Shriek		Naomie Harris Olumide Olorunfemi^{Y}						
Patrick Mulligan Toxin		Stephen Graham Sean Delaney^{Y}			Stephen Graham			
Introduced in Morbius
Martine Bancroft			Adria Arjona					Adria Arjona^{P}
Michael Morbius			Jared Leto Charlie Shotwell^{Y}					Jared Leto^{A}
Lucien / Milo			Matt Smith Joseph Esson^{Y}					
Emil Nicholas			Jared Harris					
Alberto Rodriguez			Al Madrigal					
Simon Stroud			Tyrese Gibson					
Introduced in Madame Web
Anya Corazon				Isabela Merced				
Julia Cornwall				Sydney Sweeney				
Mattie Franklin				Celeste O'Connor				
Ben Parker				Adam Scott				
Mary Parker				Emma Roberts				
Peter Parker				Uncredited infant^{C}				
Ezekiel Sims				Tahar Rahim				
Cassandra Webb Madame Web				Dakota Johnson				
Introduced in Venom: The Last Dance
Dr. Sadie Christmas Lasher					Clark Backo			
Head of Imperium					Reid Scott^{V}			
Knull King in Black					Andy Serkis			
Martin Moon					Rhys Ifans			
Nova Moon					Alanna Ubach			
Dr. Teddy Payne Agony					Juno Temple			
Rex Strickland					Chiwetel Ejiofor			
Introduced in Kraven the Hunter
Calypso						Ariana DeBose Diaana Babnicova^{Y}		
Nikolai Kravinoff						Russell Crowe		
Sergei Kravinoff Kraven						Aaron Taylor-Johnson Levi Miller^{Y}		
Dmitri Smerdyakov Chameleon						Fred Hechinger Billy Barratt^{Y}		
Foreigner						Christopher Abbott		
Aleksei Sytsevich Rhino						Alessandro Nivola		
Introduced in Spider-Noir
Ben Reilly The Spider							Nicolas Cage	
Robbie Robertson							Lamorne Morris	
Cat Hardy							Li Jun Li	
Janet Ruiz							Karen Rodriguez	
Lonnie Lincoln Tombstone							Abraham Popoola	
Flint Marko Sandman							Jack Huston	
Finbar "Finn" Byrne Silvermane							Brendan Gleeson	
Introduced in The Daily Bugle
Nicque Marina								Nicque Marina

== Reception ==
=== Box-office performance ===
Film	U.S. release date	Box office gross			All-time ranking		Budget	Ref.
Film	U.S. release date	U.S. and Canada	Other territories	Worldwide	U.S. and Canada	Worldwide	Budget	Ref.
Venom	October 5, 2018	$213,515,506	$642,569,655	$856,085,161	215	91	$100–116 million	
Venom: Let There Be Carnage	October 1, 2021	$213,550,366	$293,263,498	$506,813,864	214	241	$110 million	
Morbius	April 1, 2022	$73,865,530	$93,595,431	$167,460,961	1,194	1,188	$75–83 million	
Madame Web	February 14, 2024	$43,817,106	$56,681,658	$100,498,764	2,144	1,830	$80 million	
Venom: The Last Dance	October 25, 2024	$139,755,882	$339,175,314	$478,931,196	484	277	$120 million	
Kraven the Hunter	December 13, 2024	$25,026,310	$36,962,880	$61,989,190	3,412	2,788	$110–130 million	
Total		$709,530,700	$1,462,248,436	$2,171,779,136	–	–	$595–639 million	

=== Critical and public response ===
Critical and public response to the films
Film	Critical		Public	
Film	Rotten Tomatoes	Metacritic	CinemaScore	PostTrak
Venom	31% (365 reviews)	35 (46 reviews)	B+	80%
Venom: Let There Be Carnage	58% (283 reviews)	49 (48 reviews)	B+	76%
Morbius	15% (287 reviews)	35 (55 reviews)	C+	62%
Madame Web	10% (269 reviews)	26 (51 reviews)	C+	54%
Venom: The Last Dance	40% (225 reviews)	41 (47 reviews)	B–	73%
Kraven the Hunter	15% (160 reviews)	35 (41 reviews)	C	59%

Critical response to the television series
Series	Season	Rotten Tomatoes	Metacritic
Spider-Noir	1	92% (111 reviews)	72 (28 reviews)

=== Accolades ===
Accolades received by Sony's Spider-Man Universe films
Film	Year	Award	Category	Recipient(s)	Result	Ref.
Venom	2019	Los Angeles Online Film Critics Society Awards	Best Visual Effects or Animated Performance	Tom Hardy	Nominated	
Venom	2019	Visual Effects Society	Outstanding Effects Simulations in a Photoreal Feature	Aharon Bourland, Jordan Walsh, Aleksandar Chalyovski, Federico Frassinelli	Nominated	
Venom	2019	Taurus World Stunt Awards	Best Work With a Vehicle	Jack Gill, Henry Kingi Sr., Jalil Jay Lynch, Denney Pierce, and Jimmy N. Roberts	Won	
Venom	2019	Taurus World Stunt Awards	Best Specialty Stunt	Joe Dryden and Jimmy N. Roberts	Nominated	
Venom	2019	Taurus World Stunt Awards	Best Stunt Coordinator and/or 2nd Unit Director	Andy Gill, Jack Gill, Chris O'Hara, and Spiro Razatos	Nominated	
Venom	2019	Golden Trailer Awards	Best Action TV Spot	"Control" (Wild Card)	Nominated	
Venom	2019	Golden Trailer Awards	Best Voice Over TV Spot	"Control" (Wild Card)	Nominated	
Venom	2019	Golden Trailer Awards	Best Wildposts	"Wildposts" (LA/Lindeman Associates)	Nominated	
Venom	2019	MTV Movie & TV Awards	Best Kiss	Tom Hardy and Michelle Williams	Nominated	
Venom: Let There Be Carnage	2021	People's Choice Awards	The Movie of 2021	Venom: Let There Be Carnage	Nominated	
Venom: Let There Be Carnage	2021	People's Choice Awards	The Action Movie of 2021	Venom: Let There Be Carnage	Nominated	
Venom: Let There Be Carnage	2022	Visual Effects Society Awards	Outstanding Animated Character in a Photoreal Feature	Richard Spriggs, Ricardo Silva, Lucas Cuenca, Federico Frassinelli (for Carnage)	Nominated	
Venom: Let There Be Carnage	2022	Artios Awards	The Zeitgeist Award	Lucy Bevan, Nina Henninger (Location Casting), Emily Brockmann (Associate), Sarah Kliban (Associate)	Nominated	
Morbius	2023	Golden Raspberry Awards	Worst Picture	Avi Arad, Matt Tolmach, and Lucas Foster	Nominated	
Morbius	2023	Golden Raspberry Awards	Worst Director	Daniel Espinosa	Nominated	
Morbius	2023	Golden Raspberry Awards	Worst Actor	Jared Leto	Won	
Morbius	2023	Golden Raspberry Awards	Worst Supporting Actress	Adria Arjona	Won	
Morbius	2023	Golden Raspberry Awards	Worst Screenplay	Matt Sazama and Burk Sharpless	Nominated	
Madame Web	2025	Golden Raspberry Awards	Worst Picture	Lorenzo di Bonaventura	Won	
Madame Web	2025	Golden Raspberry Awards	Worst Director	S. J. Clarkson	Nominated	
Madame Web	2025	Golden Raspberry Awards	Worst Actress	Dakota Johnson	Won	
Madame Web	2025	Golden Raspberry Awards	Worst Supporting Actor	Tahar Rahim	Nominated	
Madame Web	2025	Golden Raspberry Awards	Worst Supporting Actress	Emma Roberts	Nominated	
Madame Web	2025	Golden Raspberry Awards	Worst Screenplay	Matt Sazama & Burk Sharpless and Claire Parker & S. J. Clarkson	Won	
Venom: The Last Dance	2025	Saturn Awards	Best Science Fiction Film	Venom: The Last Dance	Nominated	
Kraven the Hunter	2025	Golden Raspberry Awards	Worst Remake, Rip-off or Sequel	Kraven the Hunter	Nominated	
Kraven the Hunter	2025	Golden Raspberry Awards	Worst Supporting Actress	Ariana DeBose (Note: Also for Argylle)	Nominated	
Kraven the Hunter	2025	Golden Raspberry Awards	Worst Screenplay	Art Marcum & Matt Holloway and Richard Wenk	Nominated	

== Music ==
=== Soundtracks ===
Title	U.S. release date	Length	Composer(s)	Label
Venom (Original Motion Picture Soundtrack)	October 5, 2018	55:22	Ludwig Göransson	Sony Classical
Venom: Let There Be Carnage (Original Motion Picture Soundtrack)	October 1, 2021	1:07:47	Marco Beltrami	Sony Classical
Morbius (Original Motion Picture Soundtrack)	April 8, 2022	1:00:00	Jon Ekstrand	Madison Gate
Madame Web (Original Motion Picture Soundtrack)	February 14, 2024	1:00:00	Johan Söderqvist	Madison Gate
Venom: The Last Dance (Original Motion Picture Soundtrack)	October 25, 2024	57:27	Dan Deacon	Sony Classical
Kraven the Hunter (Original Motion Picture Soundtrack)	December 13, 2024	1:09:24	Benjamin Wallfisch; Evgueni Galperine; Sacha Galperine	Sony Classical
Spider-Noir (Prime Original Series Soundtrack)	May 27, 2026	58:44	Kris Bowers; Michael Dean Parsons	Sony Classical

=== Singles ===
Title	U.S. release date	Length	Artist(s)	Label	Film / Series
"Venom"	September 21, 2018	4:29	Eminem	Shady; Aftermath; Interscope	Venom
"No Problem"	October 5, 2018	2:17	Pusha T	G.O.O.D. Music; Re-Up Gang; Mass Appeal	Venom
"Let's Go (The Royal We)"	October 11, 2018	3:37	Run the Jewels	Run The Jewels, Inc.	Venom
"Last One Standing"	September 30, 2021	4:17	Skylar Grey; Polo G; Mozzy; Eminem	Shady; Interscope	Venom: Let There Be Carnage
"One Last Dance"	October 25, 2024	2:30	Tom Morello; Grandson; Roman Morello	Grand Morello	Venom: The Last Dance
"Saving Grace"	May 7, 2026	2:48	Oak Felder; Sebastian Kole; Kirby	Milan Records	Spider-Noir

== See also ==
- Spider-Man in film
