= Madame Web (soundtrack) =

Madame Web (Original Motion Picture Soundtrack)

Film score by Johan Söderqvist
- Released: February 14, 2024
- Genre: Film score
- Length: 60:00
- Label: Madison Gate Records

Johan Söderqvist chronology
The Liberation (2023)	Madame Web (Original Motion Picture Soundtrack) (2024)	Ronja, the Robber's Daughter (2024)

Madame Web (Original Motion Picture Soundtrack) is the soundtrack for the 2024 American superhero film Madame Web directed by S. J. Clarkson, featuring the Marvel Comics character Madame Web, and the fourth installment in Sony's Spider-Man Universe.

== Development ==
Johan Söderqvist was revealed to be composing the film's score, after previously working with Clarkson on Anatomy of a Scandal (2022), in November 2023. The soundtrack album was released on February 14, 2024, by Madison Gate Records.

== Track listing ==
All music is composed by Johan Söderqvist.

No.	Title	Length
1.	"Peru-73"	3:10
2.	"Las Arañas"	1:07
3.	"Forgiveness / The Weaver, No. 1"	2:29
4.	"Cassie Walks Home"	0:55
5.	"Poisoned"	1:24
6.	"The Bird"	2:28
7.	"O'Neil"	1:44
8.	"Where Are They?"	1:36
9.	"Box of Memories"	1:26
10.	"The Fight"	2:00
11.	"Drowning"	2:00
12.	"Ezekiel"	2:34
13.	"Glimpses of the Future"	0:59
14.	"The Chase"	1:22
15.	"Alone in the Woods"	2:34
16.	"Going to Peru"	2:25
17.	"Getaway"	1:51
18.	"Anya's Story"	1:18
19.	"Cassie is Leaving"	1:33
20.	"Encountering Evil"	2:15
21.	"Ezekiel Hunts Them Down"	1:28
22.	"The Cave"	1:28
23.	"We Have to Go"	1:48
24.	"Searching for Answers"	1:14
25.	"The Ambulance"	1:39
26.	"The Message"	1:28
27.	"Code Thirty"	1:42
28.	"Fireworks"	2:18
29.	"Ezekiel and Cassie"	1:01
30.	"The Weaver, No. 2"	0:39
31.	"Aftermath"	1:29
32.	"Madame Web"	1:58
Total length:		54:02

== Additional songs ==
Additional songs are featured in the movie, including:

- "Miles Away" by Yeah Yeah Yeahs
- "Breakfast At Tiffany's" by Deep Blue Something
- "La Púrpura de la Rosa: 3. ¿Tú Eres Venus?" by Graciela Oddone
- "Scandalous (StarGate Radio Mix)" by Mis-Teeq
- "Bitch" by Meredith Brooks
- "Toxic" by Britney Spears
- "I Think We're Alone Now" by Tiffany Darwish
- "Be Your Baby" by Ballsy
- “We are Madame Web” by James Long and The Turnbridgers
- "Scrooge" by Richard Addinsell
- "Final Confrontation" by John Debney (from I Know What You Did Last Summer (1997))
- "Dreams" by The Cranberries
