= Madison Gate Records =

American record label

- Parent company: Sony Pictures Entertainment
- Founded: 2010
- Distributors: Legacy Recordings, Masterworks, Sony Classical, The Orchard/RED Music
- Genre: Soundtrack
- Country of origin: U.S.
- Location: Culver City, California
- Official website: www.madisongaterecords.com

Madison Gate Records, Inc. is an American record label owned by Sony Pictures Entertainment that specializes in soundtracks and other recordings derived from films, television programs, and other entertainment media.

== History ==
Madison Gate Records is the most recent in a long line of record companies affiliated with Columbia Pictures (now a part of Sony Pictures Entertainment), beginning with Colpix Records in 1958 and including the Colgems Records, Bell Records and Arista Records labels. The label takes its name from the Madison Avenue gated entrance to Sony Pictures Studios in Culver City, California. In 2013, Madison Gate Records swept the soundtrack category at the Grammy Awards, earning wins for both Best Compilation Soundtrack for Visual Media for the soundtrack from Midnight in Paris and Best Score Soundtrack For Visual Media for the soundtrack from The Girl with the Dragon Tattoo.

== Artists ==
The a cappella group Pentatonix, which was the grand prizewinner in Season 3 of NBC's The Sing-Off, was signed exclusively to Madison Gate Records prior to signing with RCA Records in May 2014.

== Discography ==
=== Soundtracks ===
Year	Release	Type	Artist
2007	Love, Reign O'er Me (As Featured In The Motion Picture "Reign Over Me")	Single	Pearl Jam
2007	The Company (Original Television Soundtrack)	Album	Jeff Beal
2007	Dragon Tunes from "Dragon Tales" (2007 Reissue)	Album	Dragon Tales
2008	Boats 'N Hoes (From The Motion Picture "Step Brothers")	Single	Will Ferrell & John C. Reilly
2008	All I Want (Soundtrack From The Motion Picture)	Album	Andrew Gross
2008	A Raisin In The Sun [Digital Version]	Album	Mervyn Warren
2008	Nick and Norah's Infinite Playlist (Original Motion Picture Soundtrack) Deluxe Edition	Album	Various
2008	I Know What Boys Like (From The Motion Picture "The House Bunny")	Single	Katharine McPhee
2008	Crawl, End Crawl (From The Motion Picture "Quantum of Solace)"	Single	Four Tet
2008	Broken Trail (Original Motion Picture Soundtrack) [Digital Version]	Album	David Mansfield & Van Dyke Parks
2008	Surf's Up (Original Motion Picture Score) [Digital Version]	Album	Mychael Danna
2008	Lakeview Terrace (Original Motion Picture Soundtrack)	Album	Mychael Danna & Jeff Danna
2009	The Taking of Pelham 123 (Original Motion Picture Soundtrack)	Album	Harry Gregson-Williams
2009	Armored (Original Motion Picture Score) [Digital Version]	Album	John Murphy
2009	Cloudy With A Chance Of Meatballs (Original Motion Picture Soundtrack)	Album	Mark Mothersbaugh
2009	District 9 (Original Motion Picture Soundtrack)	Album	Clinton Shorter
2009	Julie & Julia (Original Motion Picture Soundtrack)	Album	Alexandre Desplat
2009	Fired Up! (Original Motion Picture Soundtrack)	Album	Various
2009	The Sing-Off (Season 1) - The Singles	Single	Various
2009	New York Is Where I Live (From "Did You Hear About the Morgans?")	Single	Steve Tyrell
2010	The Karate Kid (Music From The Motion Picture)	Album	James Horner
2010	Breaking Bad (Music From The Original Television Series)	Album	Various
2010	The Bounty Hunter (Original Motion Picture Score)	Album	George Fenton
2010	The Bannen Way Soundtrack	Album	Joseph Trapanese
2010	Grown Ups (Original Motion Picture Soundtrack)	Album	Various
2010	Easy A (Original Motion Picture Soundtrack)	Album	Various
2010	Please Give (Original Motion Picture Score)	Album	Various
2010	Long Hard Times To Come (From "Justified")	Single	Gangstagrass feat. T.O.N.E-z
2010	Community (Music from the Original Television Series)	Album	Various
2010	Monty Python's Spamalot (UK Cast Album)	Album	Spamalot UK Tour Cast
2010	Not the Messiah (He's A Very Naughty Boy) [Live at the Royal Albert Hall]	Album	Eric Idle & John Du Prez
2010	Pimps Don't Cry (Music from the Motion Picture "The Other Guys")	Single	Cee-Lo Green feat. Eva Mendes
2010	The Social Network (Soundtrack From The Motion Picture)	Album	Trent Reznor & Atticus Ross
2010	Death At A Funeral (Original Motion Picture Score)	Album	Christophe Beck
2010	Drop Dead Diva (Music From The Original Television Series)	Album	Various
2010	Takers (Original Motion Picture Soundtrack)	Album	Paul Haslinger
2010	Legion (Original Motion Picture Soundtrack) [Digital Version]	Album	John Frizzell
2010	Salt (Original Motion Picture Soundtrack)	Album	James Newton Howard
2010	The Classic Nursery Rhymes Collection	Album	Various
2010	Eat Pray Love (Original Motion Picture Soundtrack)	Album	Various
2010	The Sing-Off (Season 2) - Live Studio Recordings	EP	Various
2011	The Smurfs (Original Motion Picture Score)	Album	Heitor Pereira
2011	Straw Dogs (Original Motion Picture Score)	Album	Larry Groupé
2011	Soul Surfer (Original Motion Picture Score)	Album	Marco Beltrami
2011	Anonymous (Original Motion Picture Soundtrack)	Album	Thomas Wander & Harald Kloser
2011	Sara Tidwell: The Lost Recordings from Stephen King's 'Bag of Bones'	EP	Anika Noni Rose
2011	Friends With Benefits (Original Soundtrack)	Album	Various
2011	Moneyball (Original Motion Picture Soundtrack)	Album	Mychael Danna
2011	Country Strong (More Music From The Motion Picture)	Album	Various
2011	The Roommate (Original Motion Picture Soundtrack)	Album	John Frizzell
2011	Priest (Original Motion Picture Score)	Album	Christopher Young
2011	Arthur Christmas (Original Motion Picture Soundtrack)	Album	Harry Gregson-Williams
2011	Jumping The Broom (Original Motion Picture Soundtrack) [Deluxe Edition]	Album	Various
2011	The Sing-Off (Season 3) - Live Studio Recordings	EP	Various
2011	The Girl With The Dragon Tattoo (Soundtrack From The Motion Picture)	Album	Trent Reznor & Atticus Ross
2011	Mixture (Theme from "Franklin & Bash")	Single	Pete
2011	Midnight In Paris (Music From The Motion Picture)	Album	Various
2012	The Vow (Original Motion Picture Score)	Album	Rachel Portman & Michael Brook
2012	Ghost Rider: Spirit Of Vengeance (Original Motion Picture Score)	Album	David Sardy
2012	The Pirates! Band Of Misfits (Original Motion Picture Score)	Album	Theodore Shapiro
2012	Total Recall (Original Motion Picture Soundtrack)	Album	Harry Gregson-Williams
2012	Famous For Killing Each Other: Music From And Inspired By Hatfields & McCoys	Album	Kevin Costner & Modern West
2012	Franklin & Bash (Music From The Original Television Series), Vol. 1	EP	Pete
2012	Breaking Bad (Original Score From The Television Series)	Album	Dave Porter
2012	Drop Dead Diva (Music From The Television Series), Vol. 2	Album	Various
2012	21 Jump Street - Main Theme (From The Motion Picture "21 Jump Street")	Single	Rye Rye & Esthero
2012	21 Jump Street - Main Theme	Single	Wallpaper
2012	To Rome With Love (Original Motion Picture Soundtrack)	Album	Various
2012	Sparkle (Original Motion Picture Score)	Album	Salaam Remi
2012	The Raid: Redemption (Original Motion Picture Score & Soundtrack)	Album	Mike Shinoda & Joseph Trapanese
2012	Assassination Games (Original Motion Picture Score)	Album	Neal Acree
2012	Zero Dark Thirty (Original Soundtrack)	Album	Alexandre Desplat
2013	Ordinary Extraordinary Love (Music from "Happy Endings")	Single	Lindsey Ray
2013	Justified (Music From The Original Television Series)	Album	Various
2013	When I'm With You (Music From "The Client List")	Single	Jennifer Love Hewitt
2013	Something To Talk About (Music From "The Client List")	Single	Jennifer Love Hewitt
2013	When You Say Nothing At All (Music From "The Client List")	Single	Jennifer Love Hewitt
2013	His Eye Is On The Sparrow (Music From "The Client List")	Single	Jennifer Love Hewitt
2013	At Last (Music From "The Client List")	Single	Loretta Devine
2013	Shake A Tail Feather (Music From "The Client List")	Single	Greg Grunberg
2013	Last Resort (Original Score From The Television Series)	Album	Robert Duncan
2013	Austenland (Original Motion Picture Soundtrack)	Album	Ilan Eshkeri & Emmy the Great
2013	Premium Rush (Original Motion Picture Soundtrack)	Album	David Sardy
2013	Blue Jasmine (Music From The Motion Picture)	Album	Various
2013	Breaking Bad (Original Score From The Television Series), Vol. 2	Album	Dave Porter
2013	Battle Of The Year (Original Motion Picture Soundtrack)	Album	Various
2013	Bonnie & Clyde (Original Television Miniseries Soundtrack)	Album	John Debney
2013	The Sing-Off (Season 4) - Live Studio Recordings	EP	Various
2013	American Hustle (Original Motion Picture Soundtrack)	Album	Various
2014	El Mariachi (Soundtrack de la Serie de Television)	EP	Various
2014	The Raid 2 (Original Motion Picture Soundtrack)	Album	Joseph Trapanese, Aria Prayogi and Fajar Yuskemal
2014	The Amazing Spider-Man 2 (The Original Motion Picture Soundtrack)	Album	Various
2014	Heaven Is For Real (Original Score)	Album	Nick Glennie-Smith
2014	The Boondocks, Vol. 1 (Music From The Television Series)	EP	Various
2014	The Boondocks, Vol. 2 (Music From The Television Series)	EP	Various
2014	The Boondocks (Music from the Animated Series) [Bonus Edition]	Album	Various
2014	Deliver Us From Evil (Original Motion Picture Score)	Album	Christopher Young
2014	Outlander Main Title Theme (Sky Boat Song)	Single	Bear McCreary feat. Raya Yarbrough
2014	Magic In The Moonlight (Music From The Motion Picture)	Album	Various
2014	When The Game Stands Tall (Original Motion Picture Score)	Album	John Paesano
2014	Love is Strange (Original Motion Picture Soundtrack)	Album	Various
2014	No Good Deed (Original Motion Picture Score)	Album	Paul Haslinger
2014	Moms' Night Out (Original Motion Picture Score)	Album	Marc & Steffan Fantini
2014	Better Call Saul (Original Song)	Single	Junior Brown
2014	21 Jump Street (Original Motion Picture Score)	Album	Mark Mothersbaugh
2014	22 Jump Street (Original Motion Picture Score)	Album	Mark Mothersbaugh
2014	Space Station 76 (Original Motion Picture Score)	Album	Marc & Steffan Fantini
2014	Foxcatcher (Original Motion Picture Soundtrack)	Album	Various
2014	Annie (2014) (Original Motion Picture Soundtrack)	Album	Various
2014	The Sing-Off (A Special Holiday Event - Signature Songs)	EP	Various
2014	The Sing-Off (A Special Holiday Event - Top Three Performances)	EP	Various
2015	The Wedding Ringer (Original Motion Picture Soundtrack)	Album	Various
2015	Outlander (Original Television Soundtrack, Vol. 1)	Album	Bear McCreary
2015	To Write Love On Her Arms (Music From The Motion Picture)	Album	Various
2015	Justified (More Music From The Original Television Series)	Album	Various
2015	Songs Of Aloha (Original Motion Picture Soundtrack)	Album	Various
2015	Irrational Man (Original Motion Picture Soundtrack)	Album	Various
2015	Helix: Season 1 (Music from the Television Series)	Album	Reinhold Heil
2015	Helix: Season 2 (Music from the Television Series)	Album	Reinhold Heil
2015	The Blacklist (Music from the Television Series)	Album	Various
2015	Lady, la Vendedora de Rosas (Soundtrack de la Serie de Televisión)	Album	Osvaldo Montes & Kiño
2015	The Perfect Guy (Original Motion Picture Score)	Album	Atli Örvarsson & David Fleming
2015	Mog Mog Song (From "Singing in the Rainforest")	Single	Mylene Klass & Mog Mog
2015	Ooo La La to Panama (From "Singing in the Rainforest")	Single	Happy Mondays & Embera
2015	Walking With the San (From "Singing in the Rainforest")	Single	Charlie Simpson & San Bushmen
2015	Getting to Know You (From "Singing in the Rainforest")	Single	Scouting For Girls & Huli Wigmen
2015	Outlander (Original Television Soundtrack, Vol. 2)	Album	Bear McCreary
2015	The Walk (Original Motion Picture Soundtrack)	Album	Alan Silvestri
2015	Goosebumps (Original Motion Picture Soundtrack)	Album	Danny Elfman
2015	Better Call Saul (Original Television Soundtrack: Season 1)	Album	Various
2015	Saints & Strangers (Music from the Miniseries)	EP	Hans Zimmer & Lorne Balfe
2016	The 5th Wave (Original Motion Picture Soundtrack)	Album	Henry Jackman
2016	Risen (Original Motion Picture Score)	Album	Roque Baños
2016	Yo Soy Saúl (From the Original Television Series "Better Call Saul")	Single	Mariachi Bandido
2016	Miracles from Heaven (Original Motion Picture Soundtrack)	Album	Carlo Siliotto
2016	Heaven's Door (From the Original Television Series "Underground")	Single	Alice Smith
2016	The Water Lets You In (From the Original Television Series "Bloodline")	Single	Book of Fears
2016	Money Monster (Original Motion Picture Soundtrack)	Album	Henry Jackman & Dominic Lewis
2016	What Makes The World Go Round? (MONEY!) (From the Original Motion Picture "Money Monster")	Single	Dan the Automator & Del the Funky Homosapien
2016	Make It Bleed (From the Original Television Movie "Mother, May I Sleep With Danger)	Single	Bleeding Fingers
2016	Dark Horse (Original Motion Picture Soundtrack)	Album	Anne Nikitin
2016	Outlander (Original Television Soundtrack: Season 2)	Album	Bear McCreary
2016	When The Bough Breaks (Original Motion Picture Soundtrack)	Album	John Frizzell
2016	The Crown: Season One (Soundtrack from the Netflix Original Series)	Album	Hans Zimmer & Rupert Gregson-Williams
2017	Hugo Chávez, El Comandante (Música de la Serie de Televisión)	EP	Fonseca
2017	One Day at a Time (From the Netflix Original Series)	Single	Gloria Estefan
2017	Harder Out Here ("Sneaky Pete" Main Title Theme)	Single	The Bright Light Social Hour
2017	Outsiders (Music from the Original Television Series)	Album	Ben Miller Band
2017	Ordinary Guy (Main Theme from "Kevin Can Wait")	Single	Michael DelGuidice
2017	Smurfs: The Lost Village (Original Motion Picture Soundtrack)	Album	Christopher Lennertz
2017	Better Call Saul (Original Score from the Television Series)	Album	Dave Porter
2017	Crazy In Love (From the Original Television Movie "New York Prison Break: The Seduction of Joyce Mitchell")	Single	Bleeding Fingers
2017	Paris Can Wait (Original Motion Picture Soundtrack)	Album	Laura Karpman
2017	Maudie (Original Motion Picture Soundtrack)	Album	Michael Timmins
2017	Resident Evil: Vendetta (Original Motion Picture Soundtrack)	Album	Kenji Kawai
2017	The Dirty Dishes EP (Original Songs from the Motion Picture "Band Aid")	EP	Zoe Lister-Jones, Adam Pally & Fred Armisen
2017	The Blacklist (Original Score from the Television Series)	Album	Dave Porter
2017	S.W.A.T. (Theme from the Television Series)	Single	Robert Duncan
2017	Call Me by Your Name (Original Motion Picture Soundtrack)	Album	Various Artists
2017	Shut Eye (Main Title Theme)	Single	Melpo Mene
2017	Walk On Well Lighted Streets ("Shut Eye" Season 1 Main Title Theme)	Single	Leslie Bohem
2017	The Goldbergs Mixtape	Album	Various Artists
2018	Outlander (Original Television Soundtrack: Season 3)	Album	Bear McCreary
2018	Golden Exits (Original Motion Picture Soundtrack)	Album	Keegan DeWitt
2018	Gemini (Original Motion Picture Soundtrack)	Album	Keegan DeWitt
2018	The Rider (Original Motion Picture Soundtrack)	Album	Nathan Halpern
2018	Peter Rabbit (Original Motion Picture Score)	Album	Dominic Lewis
2018	Cobra Kai (Score from the Original Series)	Album	Zach Robinson & Leo Birenberg
2018	Who Is Clark Rockefeller? (Original Motion Picture Soundtrack)	Album	Jeff Toyne
2018	It's Party Time (from "Hotel Transylvania 3: Summer Vacation")	Single	Joe Jonas
2018	In the Cloud (Original Motion Picture Soundtrack)	Single	John Matthias & Jay Auborn
2018	The Last Tycoon (Main Title Theme from the Prime Original Series)	Single	Mychael Danna
2018	Slaughterhouse Rulez (Original Motion Picture Soundtrack)	Album	Jon Ekstrand
2018	The Vanishing of Sidney Hall (Original Motion Picture Soundtrack)	Album	Darren Morze
2018	Better Call Saul (Original Score from the TV Series)	Album	Dave Porter
2018	Origin (Original Soundtrack)	Album	Edmund Butt
2018	StartUp (Original Soundtrack)	Album	Tristan Clopet
2018	Jet Lag (from the YouTube Originals Series "Champaign ILL")	Single	Jay Pharoah
2019	De Niña a Mujer (from the Netflix Original Series "One Day at a Time")	Single	Janet Dacal
2019	The Wedding Guest (Original Motion Picture Soundtrack)	Album	Harry Escott
2019	La Bandida (Tema Principal)	Single	Sandra Echeverría
2019	The New Romantic (Original Motion Picture Soundtrack)	Album	Matthew O'Halloran
2019	Cobra Kai: Season 2 (Music from the Original Series)	Album	Zach Robinson & Leo Birenberg
2019	Strike Back (Original Television Soundtrack)	Album	Scott Shields & Paul Saunderson
2019	The Intruder (Original Motion Picture Soundtrack)	Album	Geoff Zanelli
2019	Outlander (Original Television Soundtrack: Season 4)	Album	Bear McCreary
2019	Patient Zero (Original Motion Picture Soundtrack)	Album	Michael Wandmacher
2019	The Boys (Music from the Amazon Original Series)	Album	Christopher Lennertz
2019	Aquarela (Original Motion Picture Soundtrack)	Album	Apocalyptica
2019	The Tomorrow Man (Original Motion Picture Soundtrack)	Album	Paul Leonard-Morgan
2019	Blue Moon of Kentucky (from A Lifetime Feature Movie "Patsy & Loretta")	Single	Megan Hilty & Jessie Mueller
2019	The Sound of Silence (Original Motion Picture Soundtrack)	Album	Will Bates
2019	Preacher (Original Television Soundtrack)	Album	Dave Porter
2019	Patsy & Loretta (Original Motion Picture Soundtrack)	Album	Various Artists
2019	For All Mankind: Season 1 (Apple TV+ Original Series Soundtrack)	Album	Jeff Russo
2019	Final Frontier (Theme from 'Mad About You')	Single	Lyle Lovett & Kecia Lewis
2020	Blumhouse's Fantasy Island (Original Motion Picture Soundtrack)	Album	Bear McCreary
2020	Dragon Tunes	Album	Various artists
2020	L.A.'s Finest (Original Score from the Television Series: Season 1)	Album	Raphael Saadiq & Laura Karpman
2020	L.A.'s Finest (Original Score from the Television Series: Season 2)	Album	Jeff Cardoni
2020	The Boys (Music From The Amazon Original Series: Season 2)	Album	Christopher Lennertz
2020	Cobra Kai: The Karate Kid Saga Continues (Original Gaming Soundtrack)	Album	Leo Birenberg & Zach Robinson
2020	The Craft: Legacy (Original Motion Picture Soundtrack)	Album	Heather Christian
2020	Who Wants to Be a Millionaire? (Original Television Series Soundtrack)	Album	Keith Strachan & Matthew Strachan
2021	Cobra Kai Season 3 (Soundtrack from the Netflix Original Series)	Album	Leo Birenberg & Zach Robinson
2021	For All Mankind: Season 2 (Apple TV+ Original Series Soundtrack)	Album	Jeff Russo
2021	Long Weekend (Original Motion Picture Soundtrack)	Album	Lauren Culjak
2021	Face of a Fugitive (Original Motion Picture Soundtrack)	Album	Jerry Goldsmith
2021	Blast Beat (Original Motion Picture Score)	Album	David Murillo R.
2021	The Celebrity Dating Game (Main Theme & Remixes)	EP	Cheche Alara
2021	The Young and the Restless (Original Soundtrack)	Album	Sinfonia of London
2021	Cobra Kai Wax Off EP (Original Music From The Television Series)	EP	Leo Birenberg & Zach Robinson
2021	Shamus (Original Motion Picture Soundtrack)	Album	Jerry Goldsmith
2021	84 Charing Cross Road (Original Motion Picture Soundtrack)	Album	George Fenton
2021	Jumanji: The Curse Returns (Original Gaming Soundtrack)	Album	Christopher Willis & Drew Conley
2021	I Know What You Did Last Summer (Soundtrack from the Amazon Original Series )	Album	Drum & Lace & Ian Hultquist
2021	The Karate Kid (Original Motion Picture Score)	Album	Bill Conti
2021	Stripes (Original Motion Picture Score)	Album	Elmer Bernstein
2021	A Mouthful of Air (film) (Original Motion Picture Soundtrack)	Album	John Gürtler & Jan Miserre
2021	Cobra Kai It's Karate Time (From the Cobra Kai: Season 4 Soundtrack)	Single	Leo Birenberg & Zach Robinson
2022	Cobra Kai All Valley Tournament Volume 1 (From the Cobra Kai: Season 4 Soundtrack)	Album	Leo Birenberg & Zach Robinson
2022	Cobra Kai Volume 2 (From the Cobra Kai: Season 4 Soundtrack)	Album	Leo Birenberg & Zach Robinson
2022	The Next Karate Kid (Original Motion Picture Score)	Album	Bill Conti
2022	Toy Soldiers (Original Motion Picture Soundtrack)	Album	Robert Folk
2022	The Boys Presents: Diabolical (Amazon Original Series Soundtrack)	Album	Various Artists
2022	Rosario Tijeras (Soundtrack de la Serie de Televisión)	Album	Various Artists
2022	Woke (Amazon Original Series Soundtrack)	Album	Haim Mazar
2022	Morbius (Original Motion Picture Soundtrack)	Album	Jon Ekstrand
2022	Father Stu (Original Motion Picture Soundtrack)	Album	Dickon Hinchliffe
2022	Umma (Original Motion Picture Soundtrack)	Album	Roque Baños
2022	The Blue Lagoon (Original Motion Picture Soundtrack)	Album	Basil Poledouris
2022	Return to the Blue Lagoon (Original Motion Picture Soundtrack)	Album	Basil Poledouris
2022	For All Mankind: Season 3 (Apple TV+ Original Series Soundtrack)	Album	Jeff Russo Paul Doucette
2022	Zombieland: Headshot Fever (Original Game Soundtrack)	Album	Pitstop Productions
2022	The Karate Kid Part III (Original Motion Picture Score)	Album	Bill Conti
2022	The Boys (season 3) (Amazon Original Series Soundtrack )	Album	Christopher Lennertz
2022	Better Call Saul (season 6) Perfect Day (From Better Call Saul)	Single	Dresage & Slow Shiver
2022	Summering (Original Motion Picture Soundtrack)	Album	Drum & Lace
2022	A League of Their Own (2022 TV series) (Amazon Original Series Soundtrack)	Album	We Are Dark Angels & Zachary Dawes & Nick Sena
2022	The Invitation (2022 film) (Original Motion Picture Soundtrack)	Album	Dara Taylor
2022	Cobra Kai (season 5) Volume 1 (From the Cobra Kai: Season 5 Soundtrack)	Album	Leo Birenberg & Zach Robinson
2022	Cobra Kai (season 5) Volume 2 (From the Cobra Kai: Season 5 Soundtrack)	Album	Leo Birenberg & Zach Robinson
2022	Lyle, Lyle, Crocodile (Original Motion Picture Score)	Album	Matthew Margeson
2022	Cobra Kai 2: Dojo Rising (Original Game Soundtrack)	Album	Leo Birenberg & Zach Robinson & Dan Light & Ramiro Rodriguez Zamarripa
2022	Three Pines (Original Series Soundtrack)	Album	Toydrum
2022	Boxing Day (2021 film) (Original Motion Picture Soundtrack)	Album	James Poyser
2022	Peter Pan (2003 film) (Original Motion Picture Soundtrack)	Album	James Newton Howard
2022	5000 Blankets (Original Motion Picture Soundtrack)	Album	Panu Aaltio
2022	Without Sin (Original Series Soundtrack)	Album	Tawiah & Lindsay Wright
2023	De Brutas Nada (Soundtrack de la Serie de Televisión)	Album	Various Artists
2023	The Pope's Exorcist (Original Motion Picture Soundtrack)	Album	Jed Kurzel
2023	Sisu (Original Motion Picture Soundtrack)	Album	Juri Seppä & Tuomas Wäinölä
2023	Big George Foreman (Original Motion Picture Soundtrack)	Album	Marcelo Zarvos
2023	Ghostbusters: Spirits Unleashed (Original Game Soundtrack)	Album	Mark Rutherford
2023	The Sunflower Covers (From and Inspired by the Motion Picture "Spider-Man: Across the Spider-Verse") (Original Motion Picture Soundtrack)	EP	Various Artists
2023	Hilda and the Mountain King (Original Motion Picture Soundtrack)	Album	Ryan Carlson
2023	No Hard Feelings (2023 film) (Original Motion Picture Soundtrack)	Album	Mychael Danna & Jessica Rose Weiss
2023	The Night Agent (Original Series Soundtrack)	Album	Robert Duncan
2023	Insidious: The Red Door (Original Motion Picture Soundtrack)	Album	Joseph Bishara
2023	Insidious: The Last Key (Original Motion Picture Soundtrack)	Album	Joseph Bishara
2023	Twisted Metal (TV series) (Original Series Soundtrack)	Album	Leo Birenberg & Zach Robinson
2023	Justified: City Primeval (Original Series Soundtrack)	Album	Mark Isham
2023	Hilda: Season 1 (Original Series Soundtrack)	Album	Ryan Carlson & Dan Mangan
2023	Hilda: Season 2 (Original Series Soundtrack)	Album	Ryan Carlson
2023	Dampyr (Original Motion Picture Soundtrack)	Album	Lorenzo Tomio
2023	Who is Erin Carter? (Soundtrack from the Netflix Original Series)	Album	Jack Halama
2023	The Equalizer 3 (Original Motion Picture Soundtrack)	Album	Marcelo Zarvos
2023	The Afterparty: Season 2 (Apple TV+ Original Series Soundtrack)	Album	Daniel Pemberton & David Schweitzer
2023	Gen V (Prime Video Original Series Soundtrack)	Album	Christopher Lennertz & Matt Bowen
2023	Everything Now (Soundtrack from the Netflix Series)	Album	Laura Mvula & Rupert Cross & Theo Vidgen
2023	The Persian Version (Original Motion Picture Soundtrack)	Album	Rostam Batmanglij
2023	For All Mankind: Season 4 (Apple TV+ Original Series Soundtrack)	Album	Jeff Russo & Paul Doucette
2023	My Life with the Walter Boys (Soundtrack from the Netflix Original Series)	Album	Brian H. Kim
2023	Hilda: Season 3 (Original Series Soundtrack)	Album	Ryan Carlson
2023	The Winter King (Original Series Soundtrack)	Album	Rob Lane
2023	Anyone but You (Original Motion Picture Soundtrack)	Album	Este Haim & Christopher Stracey
2024	Going Home (Original Series Soundtrack)	Album	Stephen R. Phillips & Nate Merchant
2024	Ghost Rider (Original Motion Picture Soundtrack)	Album	Christopher Young
2024	Out of Darkness (Original Motion Picture Soundtrack)	Album	Adam Janota Bzowski
2024	Madame Web (Original Motion Picture Soundtrack)	Album	Johan Söderqvist
2024	Rudy (film) (Original Motion Picture Soundtrack)	Album	Jerry Goldsmith
2024	Christine (1983 film) (Original Motion Picture Soundtrack)	Album	John Carpenter & Alan Howarth
2024	Red Eye (Original Series Soundtrack)	Album	Ian Arber
2024	Tarot (Original Motion Picture Soundtrack)	Album	Joseph Bishara
2024	Dark Matter: Season 1 (Apple TV+ Original Series Soundtrack)	Album	Jason Hill
2024	De Perdidos a Río (Canciones y Música Original)	Album	Aida Ten & Carolina Fontecha
2024	Silverado (Original Motion Picture Soundtrack)	Album	Bruce Broughton
2024	Insomnia (Original Series Soundtrack)	Album	Hannah Peel
2024	La Academia (Original Series Soundtrack)	Album	Arnau Bataller
2024	Let's Put the Christ Back in Christmas (Single from the Prime Video Original Series Soundtrack)	Single	Shoshana Bean Andrew Rannells James Monroe Iglehart &Christopher Lennertz
2024	The Boys: Season 4 (Prime Video Original Series Soundtrack)	Album	Christopher Lennertz & Matt Bowen
2024	Heart of the Cobra (Single from the Netflix Original Series)	Single	Leo Birenberg & Zach Robinson
2024	Fly Me to the Moon (Single from Apple TV+ Original Series Soundtrack)	Single	RAYE
2024	Cobra Kai: Season 6 Part 1 (Soundtrack from the Netflix Original Series)	Album	Leo Birenberg & Zach Robinson
2024	Vought’s Greatest Hits Medley (from The Boys) (Prime Video Original Series Soundtrack)	Single	Christopher Lennertz
2024	Harold and the Purple Crayon (Original Motion Picture Soundtrack)	Album	Batu Sener
2024	Colors (Single from Original Motion Picture Soundtrack)	Single	Boots Ottestad & Jordy Searcy
2024	It Ends With Us (Original Motion Picture Soundtrack)	Album	Rob Simonsen & Duncan Blickenstaff
2024	1992 (Original Motion Picture Soundtrack)	Album	Gilad Benamram
2024	Elysium (Original Motion Picture Soundtrack)	Album	Ryan Amon
2024	The Holiday (Original Motion Picture Soundtrack)	Album	Hans Zimmer
2024	Yo no soy esa (Original Motion Picture Soundtrack)	Album	Simon Smith
2024	Enter the Sekai Taikai (from the Cobra Kai: Season 6 Soundtrack)	Single	Leo Birenberg & Zach Robinson
2024	Cobra Kai: Season 6, Part 2 (Soundtrack from the Netflix Original Series)	Album	Leo Birenberg & Zach Robinson
2024	Seven Pounds (Original Motion Picture Soundtrack)	Album	Angelo Milli
2024	Cruel Intentions (TV series) (Prime Video Original Series Soundtrack)	Album	Jeff Cardoni
2024	Bajo El Mismo Techo (Banda Sonora Original)	Album	Pablo Trujillo
2025	Goosebumps: The Vanishing (Original Series Soundtrack)	Album	The Newton Brothers
2025	One of Them Days (Original Motion Picture Soundtrack)	Album	Chanda Dancy
2025	Rocket Gibraltar (Original Motion Picture Soundtrack)	Album	Andrew Powell
2025	Clean Slate (from the Original Series)	Single	Alex Newell & Pierre Charles
2025	Cobra Kai: Season 6, Part 3 (Soundtrack from the Netflix Original Series)	Album	Leo Birenberg & Zach Robinson
2025	Anatema (Original Motion Picture Soundtrack)	Album	Vanessa Garde
2025	Dope Girls (Original Series Soundtrack)	Album	NYX
2025	The Accidental Getaway Driver (Original Motion Picture Soundtrack)	Album	Jon Ong
2025	Hostel (Original Motion Picture Soundtrack)	Album	Nathan Barr
2025	Hostel: Part II (Original Motion Picture Soundtrack)	Album	Nathan Barr
2025	Un Lio de Millones (Banda Sonora Original)	Album	Vanessa Garde
2025	The Pursuit of Happyness (Original Motion Picture Soundtrack)	Album	Andrea Guerra
2025	Long Bright River (Original Series Soundtrack)	Album	James Poyser & Dimitri Smith
2025	Hollow Man (Original Motion Picture Soundtrack)	Album	Jerry Goldsmith
2025	The Other Boleyn Girl (Original Motion Picture Soundtrack)	Album	Paul Cantelon
2025	This City Is Ours (Original Series Soundtrack)	Album	Rael Jones
2025	Nine Bodies in a Mexican Morgue (Original Series Soundtrack)	Album	Chris Roe
2025	Stealth (Original Motion Picture Soundtrack)	Album	BT
2025	The International (Original Motion Picture Soundtrack)	Album	Tom Tykwer & Johnny Klimek & Reinhold Heil
2025	Hancock (Original Motion Picture Soundtrack)	Album	John Powell
2025	Starship Troopers (Original Motion Picture Soundtrack)	Album	Basil Poledouris
2025	On Swift Horses (Original Motion Picture Soundtrack)	Album	Mark Orton & Loren Kramar
2025	Zathura (Original Motion Picture Soundtrack)	Album	John Debney
2025	Identity (Original Motion Picture Soundtrack)	Album	Alan Silvestri
2025	The Craft (Original Motion Picture Score)	Album	Graeme Revell
2025	The Replacement Killers (Original Motion Picture Soundtrack)	Album	Harry Gregson-Williams
2025	Prometo (from "Yo No Soy Mendoza")	Album	VADHIR & Mariachi Colombia Nueva Era
2025	Dept. Q (Soundtrack from the Netflix Series)	Album	Carlos Rafael Rivera
2025	Monster House (Original Motion Picture Soundtrack))	Album	Douglas Pipes
2025	Vertical Limit (Original Motion Picture Soundtrack)	Album	James Newton Howard
2025	Vacances Forcées (Original Motion Picture Soundtrack)	Album	Matthieu Gonet
2025	The Smurfs 2 (Original Motion Picture Soundtrack)	Album	Heitor Pereira
2025	Rosario Tijeras: Season 4 (Soundtrack de la Serie de Televisión)	Album	Various Artists
2025	The Equalizer (Original Motion Picture Soundtrack)	Album	Harry Gregson-Williams
2025	Captain Phillips (Original Motion Picture Soundtrack)	Album	Henry Jackman
2025	White House Down (Original Motion Picture Soundtrack)	Album	Thomas Wander & Harald Kloser
2025	Alex Rider (Original Series Soundtrack)	Album	Raffertie
2025	Catch and Release (Original Motion Picture Soundtrack)	Album	BT & Tommy Stinson
2025	Spanglish (Original Motion Picture Soundtrack)	Album	Hans Zimmer
2025	Twisted Metal: Season 2 (Original Series Soundtrack)	Album	Leo Birenberg & Zach Robinson
2025	Sausage Party: Foodtopia Season 1 (Prime Video Original Series Soundtrack)	Album	Christopher Lennertz
2025	Sausage Party: Foodtopia Season 2 (Prime Video Original Series Soundtrack)	Album	Christopher Lennertz & Aleander Bornstein
2025	East of Wall (Original Motion Picture Score)	EP	Lukas Frank & Daniel Meyer O’Keeffe
2025	Gen V: Season 2 (Prime Video Original Series Soundtrack	Album	Christopher Lennertz & Matt Bowen
2025	The Nanny Named Fran (from The Nanny Television Series)	Single	Ann Hampton Callaway
2025	Boots (Netflix Original Series Soundtrack)	Album	Jongnic Bontemps
2025	La Abuela (Original Motion Picture Soundtrack)	Album	Fatima Al Qadiri
2025	A Raisin in the Sun (Original Motion Picture Soundtrack)	Album	Laurence Rosenthal
2025	Requiem for a Heavyweight (Original Motion Picture Soundtrack)	Album	Laurence Rosenthal
2025	Neighbors (Original Motion Picture Soundtrack)	Album	Bill Conti
2025	Sisu:_Road_to_Revenge (Original Motion Picture Soundtrack)	Album	Juri Seppä & Tuomas Wäinölä
2025	Anaconda_(1997_film) (Original Motion Picture Soundtrack)	Album	Randy Edelman
2025	Border Hunters (Original Motion Picture Soundtrack)	Album	Yagmur Kaplan
2025	Anaconda_(2025_film) (Original Motion Picture Soundtrack)	Album	David Fleming
2026	Red Eye Season 2 (Original Series Soundtrack)	Album	Ian Arber
2026	Gloria (Original Motion Picture Soundtrack)	Album	Bill Conti
2026	Hachi: A Dog's Tale (Original Motion Picture Soundtrack)	Album	Jan A. P. Kaczmarek
2026	Dona Beja (Original Series Soundtrack)	Album	Various Artists
2026	The Lady (Original Series Soundtrack)	Album	Chris Roe
2026	For All Mankind: Season 5 (Apple TV+ Original Series Soundtrack)	Album	Jeff Russo & Paul Doucette
2026	The Other Bennet Sister (Original Series Soundtrack)	Album	Anne Chmelewsky
2026	Stay Back! (From the Prime Original Series The Boys: Season 5)	Single	Antony Starr & Christopher Lennertz & Alex Karukas
2026	The Boys (Prime Original Series The Boys: Season 5)	Album	Christopher Lennertz & Matt Bowen
2026	The Breadwinner (Original Motion Picture Soundtrack)	Album	Leo Birenberg & Zach Robinson
2026	Open Season: Scared Silly (Original Motion Picture Soundtrack)	Album	Rupert Gregson-Williams & Dominic Lewis
2026	Bad Boys (Original Motion Picture Score) [Expanded Edition]	Album	Mark Mancina
2026	Boulevard (Original Motion Picture Soundtrack)	Album	Beatriz López-Nogales
2026	Dark Matter: Season 2 (Apple Original Series Soundtrack)	Album	Mac Quayle
2026	American Hostage (Original Series Soundtrack)	Album	Robert Duncan
2026	Flywheel: Ignition of the Soul (Original Motion Picture Soundtrack)	Album	Zack Leffew
2026	This City is Ours: Series 2 (Original Series Soundtrack)	Album	Rael Jones
2026	Ghost Soldier (Original Motion Picture Soundtrack)	Album	Brandon Roberts

=== Artist albums ===
Year	Release	Type	Artist
2011	The Backbeats (From The Sing-Off)	Album	The Backbeats
2012	The Angels Came Down	Single	Kevin Costner & Modern West
2012	PTX, Vol. 1	EP	Pentatonix
2012	Gangnam Style (Live)	Single	Pentatonix
2012	PTXmas	EP	Pentatonix
2013	Radioactive	Single	Pentatonix & Lindsey Stirling
2013	Royals	Single	Pentatonix
2013	PTX, Vol. 2	EP	Pentatonix
2013	PTXmas (Deluxe Edition)	Album	Pentatonix
2014	Say Something	Single	Pentatonix

=== Charting albums ===
Release	Year	Billboard Chart	Peak Position
Eat Pray Love (Original Motion Picture Soundtrack)	2010	Soundtrack	2
Eat Pray Love (Original Motion Picture Soundtrack)	2010	Independent Album	2
Eat Pray Love (Original Motion Picture Soundtrack)	2010	Digital Album	19
Eat Pray Love (Original Motion Picture Soundtrack)	2010	Billboard 200	21
The Social Network (Soundtrack From The Motion Picture)	2010	Soundtrack	1
The Social Network (Soundtrack From The Motion Picture)	2010	Independent Album	2
The Social Network (Soundtrack From The Motion Picture)	2010	Digital Album	3
The Social Network (Soundtrack From The Motion Picture)	2010	Modern Rock/Alternative Album	3
The Social Network (Soundtrack From The Motion Picture)	2010	Rock Album	6
The Social Network (Soundtrack From The Motion Picture)	2010	Billboard 200	20
Country Strong (More Music From The Motion Picture)	2011	Digital Album	3
Country Strong (More Music From The Motion Picture)	2011	Independent Album	3
Country Strong (More Music From The Motion Picture)	2011	Soundtrack	4
Country Strong (More Music From The Motion Picture)	2011	Country Album	5
Country Strong (More Music From The Motion Picture)	2011	Billboard 200	23
Midnight In Paris (Music From The Motion Picture)	2011	Jazz Album	4
Midnight In Paris (Music From The Motion Picture)	2011	Soundtrack	9
Midnight In Paris (Music From The Motion Picture)	2011	Independent Album	17
Midnight In Paris (Music From The Motion Picture)	2011	Billboard 200	145
The Girl With The Dragon Tattoo (Soundtrack From The Motion Picture)	2011	Soundtrack	3
The Girl With The Dragon Tattoo (Soundtrack From The Motion Picture)	2011	Independent Album	4
The Girl With The Dragon Tattoo (Soundtrack From The Motion Picture)	2011	Modern Rock/Alternative Album	10
The Girl With The Dragon Tattoo (Soundtrack From The Motion Picture)	2011	Rock Album	11
The Girl With The Dragon Tattoo (Soundtrack From The Motion Picture)	2011	Digital Album	14
The Girl With The Dragon Tattoo (Soundtrack From The Motion Picture)	2011	Billboard 200	44
PTX, Vol. 1	2012	Independent Album	2
PTX, Vol. 1	2012	Digital Album	5
PTX, Vol. 1	2012	Billboard 200	14
PTX, Vol. 1	2012	Pop Catalog	16
PTX, Vol. 2	2013	Independent Album	1
PTX, Vol. 2	2013	Digital Album	2
PTX, Vol. 2	2013	Billboard 200	10
PTXmas (Deluxe Edition)	2013	Digital Album	1
PTXmas (Deluxe Edition)	2013	Pop Catalog	1
PTXmas (Deluxe Edition)	2013	Holiday Album	3
PTXmas (Deluxe Edition)	2013	Independent Album	5
PTXmas (Deluxe Edition)	2013	Billboard 200	7
Little Drummer Boy - Single from PTXmas (Deluxed Edition)	2013	Holiday 100	1
Little Drummer Boy - Single from PTXmas (Deluxed Edition)	2013	Streaming Songs	2
Little Drummer Boy - Single from PTXmas (Deluxed Edition)	2013	Billboard Hot 100	13
Little Drummer Boy - Single from PTXmas (Deluxed Edition)	2013	Hot Digital Songs	19
Little Drummer Boy - Single from PTXmas (Deluxed Edition)	2013	Adult Contemporary	27
Little Drummer Boy - Single from PTXmas (Deluxed Edition)	2013	Canadian Hot 100	56
American Hustle (Original Motion Picture Soundtrack)	2014	Soundtrack	2
American Hustle (Original Motion Picture Soundtrack)	2014	Canadian Album	20
American Hustle (Original Motion Picture Soundtrack)	2014	Billboard 200	46
The Amazing Spider-Man 2 (The Original Motion Picture Soundtrack)	2014	Soundtrack	6
The Amazing Spider-Man 2 (The Original Motion Picture Soundtrack)	2014	Billboard 200	152
Outlander (Original Television Soundtrack, Vol. 1)	2015	Soundtrack	6
Outlander (Original Television Soundtrack, Vol. 1)	2015	Billboard 200	104
Outlander (Original Television Soundtrack, Vol. 2)	2015	Soundtrack	4
Outlander (Original Television Soundtrack, Vol. 2)	2015	Billboard 200	147
Sausage Party (Original Motion Picture Soundtrack)	2016	Comedy Album	14
Sausage Party (Original Motion Picture Soundtrack)	2016	Comedy Digital Track	12
Outlander (Original Television Soundtrack: Season 2)	2016	Soundtrack	4
Outlander (Original Television Soundtrack: Season 2)	2016	Independent Album	9
Outlander (Original Television Soundtrack: Season 2)	2016	Billboard 200	122
The Goldbergs Mixtape	2017	Comedy Album	4
Call Me by Your Name (Original Motion Picture Soundtrack)	2017	Soundtracks	14

== Awards ==
=== Grammy Awards ===
Year	Category	Release	Result
2013	Best Compilation Soundtrack for Visual Media	Midnight In Paris (Music From The Motion Picture)	Won
2013	Best Score Soundtrack for Visual Media	The Girl With The Dragon Tattoo (Soundtrack From The Motion Picture)	Won
2013	Best Boxed or Special Limited Edition Package	The Girl With The Dragon Tattoo (Soundtrack From The Motion Picture)	Nominated
2014	Best Score Soundtrack for Visual Media	Zero Dark Thirty (Original Soundtrack)	Nominated
2015	Best Compilation Soundtrack for Visual Media	American Hustle (Original Soundtrack)	Nominated
2015	Best Arrangement, Instrumental or A Cappella	Pentatonix ("Daft Punk," PTX, Vol. II)	Won
2018	Best Compilation Soundtrack for Visual Media	Call Me By Your Name (Original Motion Picture Soundtrack)	Nominated
2018	Best Song Written For Visual Media	Call Me By Your Name ("Mystery of Love" by Sufjan Stevens)	Nominated

=== Academy Awards ===
Year	Category	Release	Result
2018	Best Original Song	Mystery of Love (Sufjan Stevens)	Nominated
