= Drop Dead Diva (soundtrack) =

Soundtrack album by Various Artists
- Released: June 1, 2010 (CD)
- Genre: Soundtrack
- Label: Madison Gate Records

Music from the Original Television Series Drop Dead Diva was released by Madison Gate Records in 2010. It consists of music featured in the first season of the Lifetime television series Drop Dead Diva.

== Overview ==
The track list includes 14 songs performed by various artists that include: Brooke Elliott, Margaret Cho, Ben Feldman, Scott Starrett, Confetti, Alana D, Becca Jones, Platinum Pied Pipers, Lil' Wendy, Madi Diaz, Dri, Katie Herzig, Malbec and Joshua Morrison.

== Full track listing ==
This is the full track list for the soundtrack.

1. "Would I Lie to You" – Brooke Elliott and Margaret Cho
2. "I'll Get Mine" – Becca Jones
3. "On a Cloud" – Platinum Pied Pipers
4. "Shake It" – Lil' Wendy
5. "Restraining Order" – Margaret Cho
6. "Nothing at All" – Madi Diaz
7. "Don't Wait" – Dri
8. "Beautiful Inside" – Katie Herzig
9. "Free" – Malbec
10. "Home" – Joshua Morrison
11. "Wish You Well" – Katie Herzig
12. "Begin Again" (pop version) – Confetti
13. "Baby, I Need Your Loving" – Ben Feldman
14. "Suite from Drop Dead Diva" – Scott Starrett
