= International Film Music Critics Association Award for Best Original Score for a Fantasy/Science Fiction/Horror Film =

Film award

The International Film Music Critics Association Award for Best Original Score for a Drama Film is an annual award given by the International Film Music Critics Association, or the IFMCA. The award is given to the composer of a film score for a fantasy, science fiction and/or horror film deemed to be the best in a given year. The award was first given in 1998, but the genres were split, with fantasy films, science fiction films and horror films being grouped into their own categories. In 2005, fantasy and science fiction films were grouped together, while horror films were grouped with thriller films. It was first awarded, in its current form, in 2007, but reverted to dual categories the following year. It has been awarded, consecutively, since 2010.

== Winners and nominations ==
=== 1990s ===
Year	Film	Composer(s)
1998	Best Original Score for a Fantasy/Science Fiction Film	
1998	Star Trek: Insurrection	Jerry Goldsmith
1998	Godzilla	David Arnold
1998	Lost in Space	Bruce Broughton
1998	Merlin	Trevor Jones
1998	Sphere	Elliot Goldenthal
1998	Best Original Score for a Horror/Thriller Film	
1998	Urban Legend	Christopher Young
1998	Dark City	Trevor Jones
1998	Deep Rising	Jerry Goldsmith
1998	Halloween H20: 20 Years Later	John Ottman
1998	Scream 2	Marco Beltrami
1998	The X-Files	Mark Snow

=== 2000s ===
Year	Film	Composer(s)
2004	Best Original Score for a Fantasy/Science Fiction Film	
2004	Sky Captain and the World of Tomorrow	Edward Shearmur
2004	Harry Potter and the Prisoner of Azkaban	John Williams
2004	Hellboy	Marco Beltrami
2004	I, Robot	Marco Beltrami
2004	The Polar Express	Alan Silvestri
2004	Best Original Score for a Horror/Thriller Film	
2004	The Village	James Newton Howard
2004	Dawn of the Dead	Tyler Bates
2004	The Final Cut	Brian Tyler
2004	The Grudge	Christopher Young
2004	The Punisher	Carlo Siliotto
2005	Best Original Score for a Fantasy/Science Fiction Film	
2005	Harry Potter and the Goblet of Fire	Patrick Doyle
2005	The Brothers Grimm	Dario Marianelli
2005	Charlie and the Chocolate Factory	Danny Elfman
2005	Star Wars: Episode III – Revenge of the Sith	John Williams
2005	War of the Worlds	John Williams
2005	Best Original Score for a Horror/Thriller Film	
2005	A History of Violence	Howard Shore
2005	Constantine	Brian Tyler and Klaus Badelt
2005	House of Wax	John Ottman
2005	The Ring Two	Hans Zimmer (themes); Henning Lohner and Martin Tillman
2005	The Skeleton Key	Edward Shearmur
2006	The Lady in the Water	James Newton Howard
2006	Eragon	Patrick Doyle
2006	The Fountain	Clint Mansell
2006	Superman Returns	John Ottman
2006	X-Men: The Last Stand	John Powell
2007	Best Original Score for a Fantasy/Science Fiction Film	
2007	The Golden Compass	Alexandre Desplat
2007	Bridge to Terabithia	Aaron Zigman
2007	Mr. Magorium's Wonder Emporium	Alexandre Desplat and Aaron Zigman
2007	Stardust	Ilan Eshkeri
2007	Sunshine	John Murphy and Underworld
2007	Best Original Score for a Horror/Thriller Film	
2007	Zodiac	David Shire
2007	Flood	Debbie Wiseman
2007	I Know Who Killed Me	Joel McNeely
2007	The Orphanage	Fernando Velázquez
2007	Sleuth	Patrick Doyle
2008	Best Original Score for a Fantasy/Science Fiction Film	
2008	Inkheart	Javier Navarrete
2008	The Chronicles of Narnia: Prince Caspian	Harry Gregson-Williams
2008	City of Ember	Andrew Lockington
2008	Hellboy II: The Golden Army	Danny Elfman
2008	The Spiderwick Chronicles	James Horner
2008	Best Original Score for a Horror/Thriller Film	
2008	The Happening	James Newton Howard
2008	Let the Right One In	Johan Söderqvist
2008	Mirrors	Javier Navarrete
2008	Twilight	Carter Burwell
2008	Valkyrie	John Ottman
2009	Best Original Score for a Fantasy/Science Fiction Film	
2009	Star Trek	Michael Giacchino
2009	Avatar	James Horner
2009	The Imaginarium of Doctor Parnassus	Mychael Danna & Jeff Danna
2009	Knowing	Marco Beltrami
2009	The Twilight Saga: New Moon	Alexandre Desplat
2009	Best Original Score for a Horror/Thriller Film	
2009	Drag Me to Hell	Christopher Young
2009	Imago Mortis	Zacarías M. de la Riva
2009	In the Electric Mist	Marco Beltrami
2009	The Killing Room	Brian Tyler
2009	Trick 'r Treat	Douglas Pipes

=== 2010s ===
Year	Film	Composer(s)
2010	Tron: Legacy	Daft Punk
2010	Alice in Wonderland	Danny Elfman
2010	Daybreakers	Christopher Gordon
2010	Harry Potter and the Deathly Hallows – Part 1	Alexandre Desplat
2010	The Last Airbender	James Newton Howard
2011	Super 8	Michael Giacchino
2011	Don't Be Afraid of the Dark	Marco Beltrami & Buck Sanders
2011	Harry Potter and the Deathly Hallows – Part 2	Alexandre Desplat
2011	Hugo	Howard Shore
2011	Priest	Christopher Young
2012	John Carter	Michael Giacchino
2012	Cloud Atlas	Tom Tykwer, Johnny Klimek and Reinhold Heil
2012	The Hobbit: An Unexpected Journey	Howard Shore
2012	Prometheus	Marc Streitenfeld, Harry Gregson-Williams (additional music)
2012	Sinister	Christopher Young
2013	Evil Dead	Roque Baños
2013	Escape from Tomorrow	Abel Korzeniowski
2013	Gravity	Steven Price
2013	The Hobbit: The Desolation of Smaug	Howard Shore
2013	Star Trek Into Darkness	Michael Giacchino
2014	Maleficent	James Newton Howard
2014	Autómata	Zacarías M. de la Riva
2014	Godzilla	Alexandre Desplat
2014	The Hobbit: The Battle of the Five Armies	Howard Shore
2014	Interstellar	Hans Zimmer
2015	Star Wars: The Force Awakens	John Williams
2015	Cinderella	Patrick Doyle
2015	Crimson Peak	Fernando Velázquez
2015	Jupiter Ascending	Michael Giacchino
2015	Mad Max: Fury Road	Tom Holkenborg
2016	Fantastic Beasts and Where to Find Them	James Newton Howard
2016	Arrival	Jóhann Jóhannsson
2016	Dark Waves	Alexander Cimini
2016	Doctor Strange	Michael Giacchino
2016	The Neon Demon	Cliff Martinez
2017	War for the Planet of the Apes	Michael Giacchino
2017	Get Out	Michael Abels
2017	The Shape of Water	Alexandre Desplat
2017	Star Wars: The Last Jedi	John Williams
2017	Valerian and the City of a Thousand Planets	Alexandre Desplat
2018	Solo: A Star Wars Story	John Powell
2018	Black Panther	Ludwig Göransson
2018	Fantastic Beasts: The Crimes of Grindelwald	James Newton Howard
2018	Jurassic World: Fallen Kingdom	Michael Giacchino
2018	Ready Player One	Alan Silvestri
2019	Star Wars: The Rise of Skywalker	John Williams
2019	Avengers: Endgame	Alan Silvestri
2019	Godzilla: King of the Monsters	Bear McCreary
2019	Midsommar	Bobby Krlic
2019	Us	Michael Abels

=== 2020s ===
Year	Film	Composer(s)
2020	Wonder Woman 1984	Hans Zimmer
2020	The Invisible Man	Benjamin Wallfisch
2020	The Midnight Sky	Alexandre Desplat
2020	Wendy	Dan Romer and Benh Zeitlin
2020	The Witches	Alan Silvestri
2021	Coppelia	Maurizio Malagnini
2021	Dune	Hans Zimmer
2021	Ghostbusters: Afterlife	Rob Simonsen
2021	The Green Knight	Daniel Hart
2021	Spider-Man: No Way Home	Michael Giacchino
