= Dave Porter (composer) =

American composer

Dave Porter is an American composer, best known for his original score for the television series Breaking Bad (2008–2013), its prequel spin-off Better Call Saul (2015–2022) and the epilogue film El Camino: A Breaking Bad Movie (2019). At Sarah Lawrence College, Porter studied classical and electronic music composition.

== Breaking Bad ==
For his work on Breaking Bad, Porter has won an ASCAP Award. Bryan Cranston, who portrays Walter White, stated "With his music, Dave Porter has created another character for Breaking Bad. Evocative and meaningful, Dave's work is an essential part of the storytelling." Porter stated that influences on the series' music came from discussions with Vince Gilligan, the creator of Breaking Bad, about the show having aspects of a post-modern western. For the final episodes of the series, Porter incorporated four important themes that were in previous seasons.

== Other work ==
Porter has also composed music for NBC's crime thriller The Blacklist.

== Personal life ==
Porter has a wife, Jeanine, a son, and a daughter.

== Filmography ==
Title	Year	Type	Notes
LeTourneau Live	2000	TV movie	
Missing Mia	2004	Short	
The Third Wish	2005	Film	
Saved	2006	TV series	
Hooters Best Damn Dream Girl Special 2007	2007	TV movie	
Bigger Stronger Faster*	2008	Documentary	
Breaking Bad	2008–2013	TV series	
Chasing Classic Cars	2009–2021	TV series	
The Same Deep Water as You	2009	Short	
Smiley	2012	Film	
Red Widow	2013	TV series	
My Classic Car	2013	TV series	One episode ("Keels and Wheels")
The Blacklist	2013–2023	TV series	
Metástasis	2014	TV series	
Better Call Saul	2015–2022	TV series	
Documentary Now!	2015	TV series	One episode ("The Eye Doesn't Lie")
Flesh & Bone	2015	Mini-series	
Term Life	2016	Film	
30 for 30	2016	TV series	One episode ("The '85 Bears")
Preacher	2016–2019	TV series	
The Blacklist: Redemption	2017	TV series	
The Disaster Artist	2017	Film	
El Camino: A Breaking Bad Movie	2019	Film	
Hightown	2020–2024	TV series	
Murf the Surf	2023	TV series	
Alert: Missing Persons Unit	2023–2025	TV series	
Echo	2024	Mini-series	
Pluribus	2025–present	TV series	

== Discography ==
List of albums, with selected chart positions
Title	Album details
Breaking Bad: Original Score From The Television Series Volume 1	Released: August 28, 2012; Label: Madison Gate Records; Formats: CD, Vinyl, digital download
Breaking Bad: Original Score From The Television Series Volume 2	Released: September 22, 2013; Label: Madison Gate Records; Formats: CD, Vinyl, digital download
The Blacklist (Music from the Television Series)	Released: August 21, 2015; Label: Madison Gate Records; Formats: CD, Vinyl, digital download
Better Call Saul Original Television Soundtrack: Season 1	Released: November 6, 2015; Label: Madison Gate Records; Formats: CD, Vinyl, digital download
Flesh And Bone - Music from the STARZ Original Series	Released: January 15, 2016; Label: Varèse Sarabande; Formats: digital download
Better Call Saul (Original Score from the Television Series)	Released: April 14, 2017; Label: Madison Gate Records; Formats: CD, Vinyl, digital download
The Disaster Artist Original Motion Picture Soundtrack	Released: December 8, 2017; Label: WaterTower Music; Formats: digital download
Preacher Original Television Soundtrack	Released: September 29, 2019; Label: Madison Gate Records; Formats: digital download
El Camino: A Breaking Bad Movie Original Motion Picture Soundtrack	Released: October 14, 2020; Label: Mondo; Formats: Vinyl
Echo (Original Soundtrack)	Released: January 12, 2024; Label: Hollywood Records and Marvel Music; Formats: digital download
