= Venom: Let There Be Carnage (soundtrack) =

Venom: Let There Be Carnage (Original Motion Picture Soundtrack)

Film score by Marco Beltrami
- Released: October 1, 2021
- Studio: Sony Scoring Stage
- Genre: Film score
- Length: 67:47
- Label: Sony Classical
- Producer: Buck Sanders

Marco Beltrami chronology
American Night (2021)	Venom: Let There Be Carnage (Original Motion Picture Soundtrack) (2021)	The Shadow in My Eye (2021)

Venom: Let There Be Carnage (Original Motion Picture Soundtrack) is the soundtrack for the 2021 American superhero film Venom: Let There Be Carnage directed by Andy Serkis, featuring the Marvel Comics character Venom, the second installment in Sony's Spider-Man Universe and the sequel to Venom (2018), features an original score composed by Marco Beltrami and a series of songs in the film. After previously writing a single for the first film, Eminem was revealed to write the song "Last One Standing", in collaboration with Skylar Grey, Polo G, and Mozzy. The single was released on September 30, 2021.

Beltrami's score was released by Sony Classical Records in digital formats on October 1, 2021, in conjunction with the film's release. It later saw a physical release on October 15, followed by a vinyl edition released on November 5. Beltrami claimed it as an "opportunity to stretch the compositional wings" using an ensemble orchestra to cover a lot of emotional directions, ranging from "fun buddy-themes", "gothic horror" and a "twisted love story".

== Development ==
"Obviously when I started this a lot of the stuff was not finished. So it took a little bit of imagination. For instance, [with] that whole cathedral fight at the end, it was actually a little bit tough to know exactly what was happening. In a comic book movie, the music can be very cheery in a way, and it evolves as we change between who's winning and losing. But as the film became more refined, I'd go back and make the music more refined."

— Marco Beltrami, on scoring the film.

Marco Beltrami was hired to compose the film's music, in his first Spider-Man film, and fourth film based on Marvel Comics after The Wolverine (2013), Fantastic Four (2015) and Logan (2017). He met Serkis in a virtual meeting due to COVID-19 pandemic restrictions and discussed about how utilising the fun element in the film and not to overdo it, so as it becomes "goofy" and to maintain a right balance. He decided not to interpret Ludwig Göransson's score for the predecessor and to write new themes from scratch. He wrote several themes for the film, which includes separate themes for Venom and Eddie Brock and a buddy theme for them, a separate theme for Carnage and a theme for the love story.

Due to the COVID-19 pandemic, musicians had to record the separately which felt it as "little challenging". The electronic music had created very early in the process, which had woodwinds and brass sections. For Carnage, he worked with "creating feedback to build on that part of his character" and subsequently wrote the orchestral music in conjunction. For the Cletus story, he tuned the woodwind instruments. He wanted the theme for Venom to be "pretty recognizable" that "distills the visceral response that we get watching the character. It's a very simple theme, it's just two notes followed by three notes so it's easy to plug it in. People will be able to recognize that it's Venom's theme."

Beltrami felt the "cathedral fight" was a complex sequence for him scoring the film, as it was created during the storyboard but the effects were done before he was hired to score the film. He said "In the battle when one character starts beating the other, the music needs to acknowledge that. That's really challenging because it was hard knowing what we were doing moment to moment. The sequence is very important musically because all the themes really come together in that sequence [...] So, that probably took the longest to do. We would start sketching a version of it and as the picture became more developed we would refine the music. You don't just write the cue and turn it in, it evolves with the picture."

== Reception ==
Zanobard Reviews gave a score of 6/10 to the score, and said "Marco Beltrami's score for Venom: Let There Be Carnage is a great deal better than the score for the first film, but (at least for me) it still leaves a fair bit to be desired. There are some well-crafted themes here (take Eddie and Venom's, for example), but while they do get a fair bit of album time they just don't really feel all that memorable, nor particularly impactful on the score as a whole. Bar a couple of heroic renditions near the end, the themes don't really do all that much. Carnage's theme is also much less identifiable that the ones for the protagonists (being more murky atmosphere than tangible motif) which is a bit of a shame too. The action music as well, while enjoyable in parts, is also just kind of unremarkable. The orchestral style is there and the instrumentation sounds good, but… it just doesn't stick with you." Music critic Jonathan Broxton said "The themes are strong and memorable, the creepy drama inherent in the love theme gives the relationship between Cletus and Shriek a sense of doomed tragedy, and the action music is vibrant and intense and intricate, especially in the church-set finale. Furthermore, the stylistic throwbacks to Beltrami's late 1990s heyday remind us why many of us fell in love with his music in the first place."

Filmtracks.com wrote "Venom: Let There Be Carnage suffers from an overabundance of themes and little satisfying narrative in which they can thrive. The listener thus must pull out highlights, such as the remarkably smart and affable "Venom and Blues," for appreciation apart from the picture. The film's mid-credits scene with Spider-Man uses pieces of music from the rest of score rather an original cue written by Beltrami. There is much to like about this score, and it's certainly an improvement over its predecessor, but don't expect it to overwhelm you with a memorable presence." Soundtrack World critic Anton Smit said "While most of the music is supportive and not very pleasant to hear on its own, Beltrami did also come up with some interesting ideas."

== Track listing ==
All music is composed by Marco Beltrami.

No.	Title	Length
1.	"St. Estes Reform School (Extended)"	3:26
2.	"Cletus' Cell"	2:44
3.	"Eddie Draws"	1:30
4.	"Brock's Revival"	0:59
5.	"Lucky Slaughterhouse"	1:45
6.	"Ann's News"	1:06
7.	"Take the Hit"	1:29
8.	"Postcard From the Edge"	1:52
9.	"No Touching!"	3:31
10.	"Eddie Hangs on the Line"	1:03
11.	"Lethal Rejection"	2:04
12.	"Carnage Unleashed"	2:04
13.	"Mulligan Visits Eddie"	2:45
14.	"There is Only Carnage"	1:40
15.	"Get Shriek"	2:39
16.	"The Great Escape"	2:19
17.	"Venom Needs Food"	1:15
18.	"People Seeing Monsters"	1:30
19.	"Find Venom"	1:56
20.	"Turn on the Charm"	1:40
21.	"Eddie Escapes"	2:25
22.	"Shriek Comes Home"	2:23
23.	"You Can Eat Them All"	1:38
24.	"Unholy Matrimony Pt. 1"	6:16
25.	"Unholy Matrimony Pt. 2"	4:02
26.	"He Did Not Taste Good"	2:17
27.	"Panza and Quixote"	1:00
28.	"Venom and Blues"	2:33
29.	"Venom's Suite Tooth"	3:12
30.	"Brock and Roll"	2:44
Total length:		67:47

== Personnel ==
Credits adapted from CD liner notes.

- Music – Marco Beltrami
- Additional music – Marcus Trumpp, Miles Hankins
- Production and sound design – Buck Sanders
- Digital score recordist – Vincent Cirilli
- Recording – Adam Michalak
- Mixing – Tyson Lozensky
- Music editing – Jim Schultz
- Music coordinator – Encompass Music Partners
- Copyist – Joann Kane Music Service
- Music business and legal affairs – Mark Cavell
- Product manager – Klara Korytowska
- Liner Notes – Andy Serkis
- Design – Bosslogic

Instruments

- Bass – Geoffrey Osika, Michael Valerio, Steve Dress, Nico Abondolo
- Bassoon – Anthony Parnther, Rose Corrigan
- Cello – Dennis Karmazyn, Eric Byers, Evgeny Tonkha, Jacob Braun, Paula Hochhalter, Steve Erdody
- Clarinet – Daniel Higgins, Stuart Clark
- Drums – Haydan Beltrami
- Flute – Heather Clark, Sara Andon
- French horn – Allen Fogle, Dylan Hart, Katelyn Faraudo, Laura Brenes, Teag Reaves, Dave Everson
- Guitar – Buck Sanders, Tristan Beltrami
- Electric bass – Tristan Beltrami
- Harp – Marcia Dickstein
- Oboe – Lara Wickes
- Percussion – Ted Atkatz, Mbgordy, Pete Korpela, Wade Culbreath, Greg Goodall
- Piano – Hsin-I Huang
- Timpani – Greg Goodall
- Trumpet, trombone – Barry Perkins, Robert Schaer, Tom Hooten, Jon Lewis
- Tuba – Doug Tornquist
- Viola – Alma Fernandez, Andrew Duckles, David Walther, Zach Dellinger, Meredith Crawford, Shawn Mann, Victor De Almeida, Rob Brophy
- Violin – Amy Hershberger, Ana Lan Daue, Benjamin Jacobson, Charlie Bisharat, Darius Campo, Dennis Kim, Eun-Mee Ahn, Helen Nightengale, Jessica Guideri, Luanne Homzy, Lucia Micarelli, Maya Magub, Minyoung Chang, Phillip Levy, Roger Wilkie, Sandra Cameron, Sara Parkins, Shalini Vijayan, Steven Zander, Tamara Hatwan, Alyssa Park

Orchestra

- Orchestration – Dana Niu, Ed Trybek, Henri Wilkinson, Jonathan Beard, Mark Graham, Pete Anthony, Richard Bronskill, Rossano Galante
- Concertmaster – Tereza Stanislav
- Conductor – Pete Anthony
- Contractor – Jasper Randall, Peter Rotter
