= Morbius (soundtrack) =

Morbius (Original Motion Picture Soundtrack)

Film score by Jon Ekstrand
- Released: April 8, 2022
- Genre: Film score
- Length: 60:00
- Label: Madison Gate Records

Jon Ekstrand chronology
Horizon Line (2020)	Morbius (Original Motion Picture Soundtrack) (2022)	All the Old Knives (2022)

Morbius (Original Motion Picture Soundtrack) is the soundtrack for the 2022 American superhero film Morbius directed by Daniel Espinosa, featuring the Marvel Comics character Morbius, the Living Vampire, and the third installment in Sony's Spider-Man Universe.

== Development ==
By October 2019, Jon Ekstrand was set to compose the score for Morbius after doing the same for Espinosa's previous films. Ekstrand's score was released digitally by Madison Gate Records on April 8, 2022.

== Track listing ==
All music is composed by Jon Ekstrand.

No.	Title	Length
1.	"Dr. Michael Morbius"	1:28
2.	"Cerro de la Muerte"	4:12
3.	"Orphanage"	3:46
4.	"A Cure is Possible"	1:16
5.	"Injection"	2:41
6.	"Michael Wakes Up"	2:49
7.	"The Need for Blood"	4:03
8.	"Superhuman"	2:20
9.	"Hospital Hunt"	1:37
10.	"Research"	5:08
11.	"Main Suspect"	2:53
12.	"Stairway Escape"	1:00
13.	"Milo Leaves"	1:42
14.	"Through the Wall"	2:54
15.	"Subway Fight"	2:05
16.	"Subway Flight"	1:28
17.	"Michael Needs a Lab"	2:19
18.	"House Search"	1:54
19.	"Rooftop Flight"	2:36
20.	"Night Hunt"	3:55
21.	"Birds of Prey"	2:13
22.	"The Rise of Morbius"	3:16
23.	"Morbius Flight"	2:49
Total length:		60:00

== Additional songs ==
Additional songs are featured in the movie, including:

- Festive Overture, Op. 96 by Dmitri Shostakovich
- "Town Called Malice" by The Jam
- "Rich Dreaming" by Moe
- "Clark Kent" by Tokyo's Revenge
- "Mata Siguaraya" by Beny More
- "EKSE" by Off the Meds
- "The Kill" by Jessie Ware
