= Priest (soundtrack) =

2011 film soundtrack album

Priest (Original Motion Picture Soundtrack)

Film score by Christopher Young
- Released: May 10, 2011
- Recorded: 2010–2011
- Genre: Film score
- Length: 55:09
- Label: Madison Gate Records
- Producers: Christopher Young; Max Blomgren

Christopher Young chronology
| The Black Tulip (2010) | Priest (2011) | The Rum Diary (2011) |

Priest (Original Motion Picture Soundtrack) is the film score to the 2011 film Priest directed by Scott Stewart and starred Paul Bettany as the title character. The film score is composed by Christopher Young and released through Madison Gate Records on May 10, 2011.

== Background ==
The film score to Priest (2011) was composed by Christopher Young. The score utilized traditional church organs that blended with choral arrangements and utilized unique vocal textures, that included throat singing and ethereal solos, and accompanied extensive use of orchestra. The score was released through Madison Gate Records on May 10, 2011.

== Reception ==
Jonathan Broxton of Movie Music UK wrote "Priest is a marvelous listening experience from start to finish, filled with avant-garde orchestral and choral textures, colorful action music, and no small amount of majestic religioso beauty. There's virtually nothing to criticize about the score; at a touch under an hour it never outlasts its welcome, it constantly presents refreshing and interesting compositional ideas, it manages to take the all-pervasive RC cello lines and make them work well in a different setting, and it confirms Christopher Young as the undisputed master of this kind of music, as he has been since the mid-1980s." Filmtracks wrote "Priest may not be the intellectual marvel of Drag Me to Hell, but it's even more entertaining [...] Most importantly, like Patrick Doyle earlier in the same year, Young proves that the fads in today's blockbuster film score conventions can be re-packaged in ways that diminish the lesser composers who rely solely upon them."

Thomas Glorieux of Maintitles.net had "the power and craftsmanship of "The Vampire Train", now that's you want in any blockbuster movie." Daniel Schweiger of AssignmentX wrote "Through all the glorious sound and fury, Young brings a real sense of rhythmic development to Priest's lengthy cues that make this soundtrack stand high on his altar of horror action." Eoin of The Action Elite wrote "Young has created something really special with the Priest score and it's a great shame that it may end up being forgotten. If you like BIG sounding orchestral action/horror movie music then Priest is utterly essential and is one of the best action/horror scores you will ever hear, trust me."

== Track listing ==
| No. | Title | Length |
|---|---|---|
| 1. | "Priest" | 3:26 |
| 2. | "Eclipsed Heart" | 3:34 |
| 3. | "I Have Sinned" | 5:07 |
| 4. | "Blood Framed Hell" | 3:52 |
| 5. | "Sacrosanct Delirium" | 7:44 |
| 6. | "Never One For Love" | 2:38 |
| 7. | "Faith Work Security" | 2:14 |
| 8. | "The Vampire Train" | 7:00 |
| 9. | "Fanfare For A Resurrected Priest" | 2:39 |
| 10. | "Cathedral City Blue" | 6:44 |
| 11. | "Detuned Towne" | 2:33 |
| 12. | "A World Without End" | 7:38 |
| Total length: | | 55:09 |

== Personnel ==
Credits adapted from liner notes:

- Music composer – Christopher Young
- Music producer – Christopher Young, Max Blomgren
- Orchestra – The Slovak National Symphony Orchestra
- Orchestrators – Benoit Grey, Christopher Young, David Shephard, Jorgen Lauritson, Peter Bateman, Richard Bronskill, Sean McMahon
- Orchestra conductor – Allan Wilson
- Orchestra contractor – Paul Talkington
- Orchestra manager – Marion Turner
- Choir – Lucnica Chorus
- Programming – Gregory Tripi, Jonathan Timpe, Max Blomgren
- Recording – Martin Roller, Peter Fuch
- Mixing – Robert Fernandez
- Mastering – Patricia Sullivan
- Music editors – Steven Saltzman, Tom Milano
- Pro-tools operator – Vincent Cirilli
- Executive producer – Scott Stewart
- Album coordinator – Tim Ahlering
- Score coordinator – Brandon Verrett, Joohyun Park, Simon Stevens
- Scoring coordinator – Samantha Barker
- Copyist – Thanh Tran, Vladimir Martinka
- Art direction and design – Elizabeth Prochnow
- Executive in charge of music – Spring Aspers

== Accolades ==
| Year | Award | Category | Recipient(s) and nominee(s) | Result | Ref. |
|---|---|---|---|---|---|
| 2011 | International Film Music Critics Association | Best Original Score for a Fantasy/Science Fiction/Horror Film | Christopher Young | Nominated | |
| 2012 | Motion Picture Sound Editors | Best Sound Editing – Music in a Feature Film | Thomas Milano (supervising music editor); Jaclyn Newman Dorn, Cory Milano, Steven A. Saltzman (music editors); Daniel Pinder (temp music editor) | Nominated | |
