= Chris Roe =

Australian broadcaster and journalist

- Born: 14 January 1975 (age 51)
- Occupation: Journalist

Chris Roe (born 14 January 1975) is an Australian broadcaster and journalist.

== Career history ==
With a background as a radio announcer at Outback Radio 2WEB, Rural Press and DMG Radio, Roe has spent the last 12 years in television working as a producer and presenter in news and sport.

After starting in television at Fox Sports Australia, Roe joined Sky News Australia in 2004 as a sports producer and presenter. Roe anchored weekend news since 2006 and regularly filled in on news programs across the week. He exited Sky News in 2013.

Roe moved to NITV after leaving Sky. As of January 2020, he was executive producer for NITV's The Point.

At the 2018 Kennedy Awards for Excellence in Journalism, Chris Roe and Karla Grant won the John Newfong Award for Outstanding Indigenous Affairs Reporting for their work at NITV.

== Study ==
Roe completed a Bachelor of Arts in communications at Charles Sturt University in Bathurst and is currently undertaking a Master of Arts in ancient history at Macquarie University Sydney.
