= The Client List =

2010 American television film

- Promotional poster
- Created by: Suzanne Martin
- Written by: Suzanne Martin
- Directed by: Eric Laneuville
- Starring: Jennifer Love Hewitt; Teddy Sears; Sonja Bennett; Lynda Boyd; Chelah Horsdal; Heather Doerksen; Kacey Rohl; Kandyse McClure; Cybill Shepherd
- Theme music composer: Richard Marvin
- Country of origin: United States
- Original language: English

Production
- Producers: Ted Bauman; Howard Braunstein; Jennifer Love Hewitt; Michael Jaffe; Dannielle Thomas
- Editor: Lisa Robison
- Running time: 97 minutes
- Production company: Sony Pictures Television

Original release
- Network: Lifetime Network
- Release: July 19, 2010

The Client List is an American television film that premiered on the Lifetime Network on July 19, 2010. It starred Jennifer Love Hewitt and was directed by Eric Laneuville. The film is a fictionalized dramatization of a 2004 prostitution scandal in Odessa, Texas. It follows Sam Horton, a mother of three who becomes a prostitute to meet her financial obligations.

== Plot ==
Samantha and Rex Horton are unemployed and struggling to provide for their three children Charlie, Brady and Jenna and keep their home. Desperate to stave off foreclosure, the couple dresses up and goes to the bank to try to renegotiate their mortgage. Sam puts on a sexy dress, makes herself up and puts on special perfume to subliminally sway the banker. However, it does not work and they are told they have less than a month to make a payment or the bank forecloses on their house.

With their family desperate for money, Sam takes a job at a massage parlor, but quickly learns it is essentially a house of prostitution, with the internal motto "beats the hell out of waitressing". As the Hortons are down to their last dollar, Samantha stays, and quickly becomes one of the most popular employees, being very personable with her clients.

While her earnings increase, she hides the true nature of her job from her family and friends, even while lavishing them with expensive gifts. Rex later finds work again himself. Sam's popularity causes another problem: exhaustion, affecting her relationships. One of her clients gives her cocaine to keep her going.

When a very young masseuse reveals the true nature of the parlor to a church group, public pressure on the mayor, who is up for re-election, leads to a police raid. This is even though many on the force are also clients. Sam's arrest is shown live on television at the bar Rex frequents. Her drug supply is also found, leading to an additional charge for possession.

Sam is bailed out of jail by her close friend Dee, the only one she confided in about the real nature of her job. She berates her for not having the courage to drop the job after her needs were met. Rex and Sam separate. Her other friend, Laura, is a lawyer who convinces Sam to put together a "client list" of the more prominent "johns". Their cooperation gets Sam and co-workers light jail sentences.

After her release from jail, Samantha is confronted by several of the clients' wives. She fears they have come to attack her, but they are actually looking for advice on how to improve their marriages. Attempting to move on, she becomes a waitress and goes back to college. Sam hopes to patch things up with Rex, who at least now is able to look at her again.

== Cast ==
- Jennifer Love Hewitt as Samantha "Sam" Horton
- Teddy Sears as Rex Horton
- Sonja Bennett as Dee
- Lynda Boyd as Jackie
- Chelah Horsdal as Doreen
- Heather Doerksen as Tanya
- Kacey Rohl as Emma
- Kandyse McClure as Laura
- Cybill Shepherd as Cassie

== Reception ==
=== Ratings ===
The Client List drew in an audience of 3.9 million viewers and was the highest rated program for the evening amongst female viewers between the ages of 18 and 49.

=== Critical response ===
On Rotten Tomatoes it has an approval rating of 83% based on reviews from 6 critics, but with an average rating of 5.5 out of 10.

Entertainment Weekly's Ken Tucker considered it a typical Lifetime film that "offer[ed] cheap thrills ... while offering moral uplift." Calling it "malarkey," he felt that Hewitt was able to sell the film to the audiences due to her "talent for communicating sincerity and charm."

== Awards and nominations ==
The film received a Golden Globe nomination for Jennifer Love Hewitt in the category "Best Performance by an Actress in a Mini-Series or Motion Picture Made for Television," but lost to Claire Danes starring as Temple Grandin in the film of the same name.

== Home media ==
The film was released on DVD in January 2011 in North America.

== Television series ==
On August 10, 2011, it was announced that Lifetime had ordered production of The Client List television series based on the film. Hewitt acted as the lead role and also served as an executive producer. The series was a re-imagination of the film (with Hewitt's character having a different name from the film), and was not a direct continuation of the film's story line. The series premiered on April 8, 2012. On November 1, 2013, Lifetime cancelled the series after two seasons; the final episode of the series aired on June 16, 2013.
