= Venom (Sony's Spider-Man Universe) =

Character in Marvel film franchises

- Sony's Spider-Man Universe and Marvel Cinematic Universe character
- Tom Hardy as Eddie Brock and Venom in Venom (2018)
- First appearance: Venom (2018)
- Last appearance: Venom: The Last Dance (2024)
- Based on: Venom by: David Michelinie; Todd McFarlane
- Adapted by: Jeff Pinkner; Scott Rosenberg; Kelly Marcel
- Designed by: Matt Millard; David Masson
- Voiced by: Tom Hardy; Brad Venable (2018)

In-universe information
- Aliases: SYM-A01; Lethal Protector
- Species: Symbiote
- Occupation: Vigilante
- Children: Carnage
- Hosts: Eddie Brock; Anne Weying; Mrs. Chen

Venom is a fictional character portrayed by Tom Hardy in feature films of Sony's Spider-Man Universe, based on the Marvel Comics character of the same name. Introduced in Venom (2018), Venom is depicted as a symbiote who binds with human investigative journalist Eddie Brock after landing on Earth. Together, they become a vigilante known as Venom — later called the Lethal Protector. As fugitives, they face Venom's former team leader Riot, Venom's son Carnage, Rex Strickland's military squadron, and the Xenophages — sent by Knull (the creator of the symbiotes) to obtain the Venom Codex and free him from his prison.

They are the second incarnation of the character in film, after Topher Grace and Tobey Maguire's respective portrayals of Eddie Brock / Venom and a symbiote-enveloped Spider-Man in Spider-Man 3 (2007). As of 2024, the character has appeared in four films: Venom, Venom: Let There Be Carnage (2021), Venom: The Last Dance (2024), and an uncredited cameo appearance in the Marvel Cinematic Universe film Spider-Man: No Way Home (2021). While Hardy's portrayal of the character in Venom was met with a mixed critical reception, the chemistry between Eddie Brock and Venom received praise.

== Concept and creation ==
The idea of giving Spider-Man a new, black costume was conceived by Randy Schueler, a Marvel Comics reader from Norridge, Illinois. In 1982, Marvel editor-in-chief Jim Shooter compensated Schueler for his costume concept and offered him the opportunity to write the character's debut (though that offer never panned out). "The Alien Costume" first appeared in The Amazing Spider-Man #252 (May 1984), before fully materializing as Venom in the series' 300th issue (May 1988), written by David Michelinie and drawn by Todd McFarlane. Writer Michelinie originally conceived Venom's host as a female character, but editor Jim Salicrup objected, believing the character needed to be physically imposing enough for fans to accept as a credible threat to Spider-Man. Eddie Brock was created as a male host instead. In 1994, Eddie Brock was retconned to have appeared briefly in Web of Spider-Man #18 (September 1986), (with only his hand visible in a panel), which revealed he was the mystery assailant who attacked Peter Parker in that issue.

=== Post-Spider-Man 3 ===
By July 2008, Sony Pictures was actively developing a spin-off film based on Venom alongside direct sequels to Spider-Man 3 (2007), hoping the character could "add longevity" to the franchise in a similar fashion to Wolverine in 20th Century Fox's X-Men films. Industry insiders suggested Topher Grace, who portrayed Brock in Spider-Man 3, should return for the spin-off because "the likeable actor could be a sympathetic evildoer", in response, McFarlane suggested that a Venom film could not do well with a villain as the central character.

He was a journalist [who] got in trouble for it ... the whole essence to us for the Marvel characters: stay close to the bible, stay close to the emotional story, and the rest is fun.

— Producer Matt Tolmach, on staying true to the character's comic book origins when developing Venom

In December 2013, Sony revealed plans to use The Amazing Spider-Man 2 (2014) to establish their own expanded universe based on the Marvel properties they had the film rights to, including Venom. Since the film underperformed, in February 2015, Sony and Marvel Studios announced a partnership that would see Marvel Studios produce the next Spider-Man film for Sony, and integrate the character into the Marvel Cinematic Universe (MCU). Sony still planned to produce the spin-off films on their own, but by November Sony had been focused on its new reboot with Marvel Studios and were believed to have been canceled.

==== Revival and casting ====
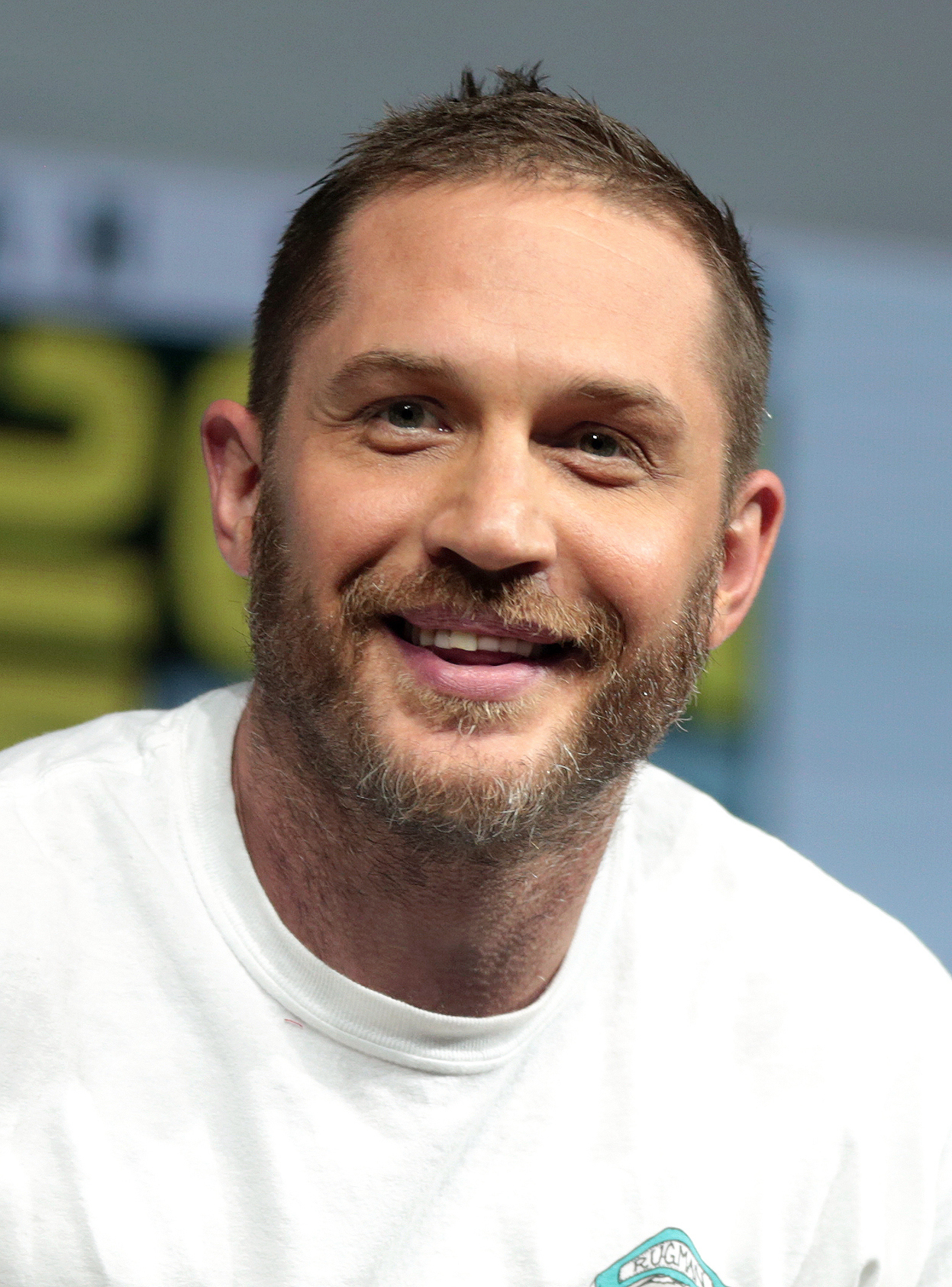
When he was approached about starring in the film, Tom Hardy was already interested in Venom due to his son's love for the character.

In March 2016, Sony revived the Venom film, being envisioned as a standalone film launching its own franchise unrelated to Sony and Marvel Studios' MCU Spider-Man films. In May 2017, Sony announced that Tom Hardy would star as Eddie Brock / Venom in the film, officially beginning a new shared universe that was later titled "Sony's Spider-Man Universe". The casting of Hardy, whose son was a big fan of Venom, happened quickly after he had left Triple Frontier (2019) in April and Sony saw "an opportunity to court an in-demand talent". Brad Venable provided additional voiceover for Venom's pain and grunting sounds in Venom, his voice being combined with Hardy's for some dialogue, such as "We are Venom". Hardy signed on for three Venom films, which included Venom: Let There Be Carnage (2021).

After the Let There Be Carnage mid-credits scene showed Brock and Venom being transported from their universe into the MCU, many commentators expected Hardy to reprise his roles in the MCU film Spider-Man: No Way Home (2021). Hardy ultimately appeared as Brock in the film's mid-credits scene, though there had been discussions about integrating him into the film's final battle. The character unknowingly leaves a piece of the Venom symbiote behind in the MCU at the end of the scene.

== Characterization ==
Venom director Ruben Fleischer said that unlike a werewolf or Jekyll and Hyde, the relationship between Venom and Brock is a "hybrid", with the two characters sharing a body and working together. Hardy was drawn to this duality, and compared the pair to the animated characters Ren and Stimpy. Hardy gave Eddie an "aw-shucks American accent" while using a "James Brown lounge lizard"-like voice for Venom, that was later "modulated to sound more sinister". Hardy called Venom an antihero who would "do whatever he has to" to accomplish a goal. Let There Be Carnage director Andy Serkis described the pair in the "Odd Couple stage" of their relationship, with Venom trapped in Brock's body and just wanting to be the "Lethal Protector" which distracts Eddie from work and putting his life back together.

=== Relationship with Eddie Brock ===
Kate Gardner of The Mary Sue wondered whether Venom had been "queer-coded", a term referring to character appearing queer without their sexuality being a part of the story (Venom's species is asexual, having no actual genders, and reproduces asexually). Gardner soon noticed fan art depicting Brock and Venom as a couple appearing across social media sites, acknowledging that there were several moments throughout the film that implied such a relationship, including Venom turning against his species because of his time with Brock and deciding to french kiss Brock while transferring from Weying to him. Many of the fans posting the art and discussing the characters' relationship online began using the name "Symbrock" to refer to them. Amanda Brennan, lead of Tumblr's Fandometrics analysis team, said that "Symbrock" fans existed before the film due to comics, but the increase in popularity was "undoubtedly" due to the film's portrayal of the characters which she said made Venom's dialogue more "casual" compared to how he speaks in comics, adding Brennan that dialogue such as "I am Venom and you are mine" was deemed to be particularly romantic by these fans, as was the idea that Venom be seen not as a parasite but as someone who "chose [Eddie] Brock and has a connection to [Eddie] Brock".

When Sony began advertising the home media release of the film by presenting it as a romantic comedy focused on Brock and Venom's relationship, io9's Charles Pulliam-Moore said it was the treatment the film deserved, attributing the change in strategy from the studio to the audience's response to the relationship. He added that it was rare for a film studio to "get on top of a so-so ad campaign" by adjusting towards the public's "reaction to a movie", believing it to have been successful. Michael Walsh at Nerdist agreed with Pulliam-Moore, describing the move as "fully embrac[ing] 'Symbrock'" and calling it "brilliant". Walsh said that though the advertisement was clearly a parody, it also "feels like a far more accurate portrayal of what the movie was really like than the initial [marketing] hinted at", and further highlighted the kissing scene.

== Fictional character biography ==
Eddie Brock
- Sony's Spider-Man Universe character
- Tom Hardy as Eddie Brock in Venom: Let There Be Carnage (2021)
- First appearance: Venom (2018)
- Last appearance: Venom: The Last Dance (2024)
- Based on: Eddie Brock by: David Michelinie; Todd McFarlane
- Adapted by: Jeff Pinkner; Scott Rosenberg; Kelly Marcel
- Portrayed by: Tom Hardy

In-universe information
- Full name: Edward Charles Allan Brock
- Aliases: Venom; Lethal Protector (with Venom)
- Species: Human
- Occupation: Investigative journalist; Vigilante
- Affiliation: The Brock Report; The Daily Globe; Chen's Market
- Significant other: Anne Weying (ex-fiancée)
- Nationality: American

=== Bonding with Eddie Brock ===
After being brought to Earth on a space shuttle by astronaut John Jameson as part of an invasion force of symbiotic lifeforms led by Riot, Venom and his team are captured by the Life Foundation, who bring them to San Francisco to begin a series of human trials in an attempt to achieve "symbiosis" and bind them to living beings, while Riot himself is stranded in Malaysia. Six months later, Venom is freed by an oblivious Eddie Brock as he attempts to free Maria, a homeless acquaintance of his whom Venom has been bound to. Transferring to Eddie's body, leaving Maria dead, Venom escapes the facility, while his two brethren die. As he begins to hear Venom's voice, Eddie reaches out to his ex-fiancée Anne Weying and her new boyfriend, Dr. Dan Lewis, for help and Lewis discovers the symbiote on examining Eddie. After Eddie is attacked by Life Foundation mercenaries to retrieve the symbiote, Venom manifests around his body as a monstrous creature that fights off the attackers and formally introduces himself to Eddie, declaring that "I am Venom, and you are mine."

After explaining their origins to Eddie, Venom assists him in breaking into his old workplace in order to turn in evidence of Life Foundation CEO Carlton Drake's numerous crimes, marveling at the cityscape of San Francisco after climbing atop a skyscraper. Subsequently, surrounded by SWAT officers alerted to the break-in, Venom and Eddie are forced to fight to escape, witness by Anne, who uses an MRI machine to separate Eddie from Venom, Dan having concluded that Venom's presence in Eddie's body is killing him: Venom subsequently explains that he would require sustenance from elsewhere to maintain a host, it was the Life Foundation's decision not to feed him that led to his previous hosts' deaths and that the previous hosts were all bad matches for him, as opposed to Eddie. After Eddie is captured by Drake, now bonded to Riot (having found his way into the country through several hosts), who is in search of Venom, Anne bonds with Venom herself to free Eddie, who returns to Eddie's body by lifting him up and kissing him. Admitting that he is seen as a "loser" like Eddie on his home planet, Venom decides to abandon the Symbiotes' invasion and prevent Drake and Riot from using a rocket to return to the comet their species came from to acquire reinforcements, instead causing it to explode and kill them, with Venom apparently sacrificing himself to save Eddie. After the incident, Eddie returns to journalism, still secretly bound to Venom without Anne's knowledge, setting out to protect San Francisco by killing criminals. Confronting a criminal who had been extorting local convenience store owner Mrs. Chen, the duo devours him, declaring that "We are Venom." Sometime later, Eddie and Venom help Mrs. Chen film television advertisements for her store, holding her video camera for her before Venom expresses interest in eating Mrs. Chen's model.

=== Fighting Carnage ===
One year later, after Eddie visits incarcerated serial killer Cletus Kasady to interview him (Note: As depicted in Venom (2018).)at the behest of Detective Patrick Mulligan, Venom can figure out where Kasady has hidden the bodies of victims, which gives Eddie a huge career boost. After Kasady subsequently invites Eddie to attend his execution by lethal injection, Venom is provoked to attack Kasady via insults towards Eddie. After briefly witnessing Venom's true form, Kasady bites Eddie's hand, unknowingly ingesting a small part of Venom as they reproduce. Eddie is then contacted by Anne, who tells him that she is now engaged to Dan, much to Venom's displeasure.

Wanting more freedom to eat human brains instead of chicken brains, Venom has an argument with Eddie, and the two end up fighting until the symbiote detaches from his body; they go their different ways. Venom makes his way through San Francisco by hopping from body to body and attending a rave until Anne finds him at Mrs. Chen's store and convinces him to forgive Eddie. She bonds with Venom herself to break Eddie out of a police station after he is arrested on suspicion of aiding in Kasady's escape from prison, as the symbiote piece he had ingested metamorphoses into Venom's offspring "Carnage." Making amends, Venom and Eddie bond again. Arriving at a cathedral with Dan, where Kasady and his lover Frances Barrison plan to get married, after Barrison and Kasady take Anne and Mulligan hostage, respectively. Venom is shocked to see Carnage ("a red one") envelop Kasady and address them as "father", seeking to eat them, refusing to fight until Eddie promises to let him eat "everybody." Venom begins to fight Carnage but is quickly overpowered, and the latter decides to kill Anne atop the cathedral. Venom manages to rescue Anne in time with Dan's help and provokes Barrison to use her sonic blast powers, causing both symbiotes to separate from their hosts as the cathedral collapses and the falling bell kills Barrison. Venom saves Eddie by bonding with him along with the help of Anne and Dan before the impact. Carnage tries to bond with Kasady again, but Venom devours him before biting Kasady's head off and escapes with Brock from the police, bidding farewell to Anne and Dan, and takes a tropical vacation with Brock.

=== Entering an alternate reality ===
Later, as Venom tells Brock about the symbiotes' hive mind knowledge across universes, (Note: Brock and Venom are transported from their universe into the Marvel Cinematic Universe in the mid-credits scene of Venom: Let There Be Carnage due to the events of Spider-Man: No Way Home (both 2021). The scene establishes a collective symbiote hive knowledge across the multiverse, which No Way Home writers Chris McKenna and Erik Sommers said had allowed Brock and Venom to transport.) a blinding light transports the pair to an alternate reality where they watch J. Jonah Jameson expose Spider-Man's identity as Peter Parker and as a "murderer" on television. (Note: As depicted in Spider-Man: Far From Home (2019).) After leaving the hotel, Venom and Brock go to a bar and learn about the new universe and individuals such as Tony Stark, Bruce Banner, Thanos, and a major event known as the Blip. As Brock decides to go to New York and find Spider-Man, he and Venom are returned to their universe, while unknowingly leaving a piece of the Venom symbiote behind, which slowly starts moving.

=== Escaping from both worlds ===
After returning to their universe, Eddie and Venom are drunk in a bar in Mexico, (Note: Eddie travels to two versions of this place, the first of which is the version seen at the end of Spider-Man: No Way Home (2021) on Earth-616, the main timeline for the Marvel Cinematic Universe (MCU). Afterwards, they return to the same bar in their home universe, Earth-688, the designation for Sony's Spider-Man Universe (SSU).) still on the run after their recent battle with Carnage. (Note: As depicted in Venom: Let There Be Carnage (2021).) The murder of Patrick Mulligan makes international headlines with Eddie being named the prime suspect, forcing him to set out to New York City, where he was banished long ago by a corrupt judge, and decides to blackmail him in an attempt to clear his name. Unbeknownst to either of them, a creature known as the Xenophage has begun tracking Eddie and Venom, including Imperium, an organization that collects other symbiotes that have fallen to Earth.

They hitch a ride to the side of a plane bound for New York City, until Eddie and Venom are attacked by the tracking Xenophage and forced to crash in a desert field. Venom explains to Eddie that the Xenophage were released into the universe by Knull, the creator of the symbiotes, in order to retrieve a "Codex" forged when a symbiote resurrects its host. This can free Knull from the prison the symbiotes trapped him in long ago. Because Venom revived Eddie once before, (Note: As depicted in Venom (2018).) he now carries a Codex that the Xenophage tracked to Earth. After being ambushed by the commander of the Imperium, Rex Strickland and his team while barely escaping from them and the Xenophage, Eddie meets Martin Moon and his family of traveling hippie and alien enthusiasts who offer him a ride to Las Vegas on their way to Area 51. Eddie and Venom run into Mrs. Chen at a casino and Venom shares a dance with her before being ambushed by the Xenophage again. Strickland's team arrives, separates Venom from Eddie and takes them to Area 51 (Area 55, Imperium Program) where Eddie reunites with Mulligan. Sadie Christmas frees Venom who rebonds with Eddie after Strickland shoots him. Following the Xenophage's attack, Mulligan protects Venom so he can escape before sacrificing himself. Venom has the other confined symbiotes released, which bond with Sadie and other hosts to fight off the Xenophage, who has signaled to Knull that the Codex has been found. Knull sends more Xenophages through portals to Earth, overwhelming the symbiotes. Escaping the base, Eddie, Venom, and the symbiotes team up to save Moon and his family from attack. Realizing he must sacrifice himself to destroy the Codex and save the universe, Venom merges with the Xenophages, leads them into acid tanks, and bids Eddie farewell before ejecting him as a mortally-wounded Strickland sets off his grenades to destroy them, including himself. Following Venom's death during the explosion, Eddie falls unconscious as the base burns.

Eddie later wakes up in a hospital, where a military official informs Eddie that his actions with Venom at Area 51 have earned him a pardon, under the condition of keeping the events that transpired a secret. Arriving in New York City, Eddie starts a new life and gazes at the Statue of Liberty while remembering Venom, and promises to himself to never forget his best friend.

After a panicked bartender escapes the burned remains of Area 51, a black cockroach crawls out of the rubble, alongside a broken vial that previously contained a sample of the Venom symbiote.

== Differences from the comic books ==
Venom is primarily based on the 1993 Venom: Lethal Protector miniseries and the 1995 "Planet of the Symbiotes" story arc, borrowing the San Francisco setting of the former. Due to Sony and Marvel Studios' 2015 deal for Spider-Man to enter the MCU, the character could not appear in the film itself, challenging the writers to make a Venom origin story without Spider-Man. The writers and concept artists looked to the Ultimate Marvel version of Venom (created by Brian Michael Bendis and Mark Bagley), whose origin was not related to Spider-Man and similarly does not have a spider-logo engraved in their chest. Jeff Pinkner and Scott Rosenberg were told that Spider-Man could not be in the film before the initial pitch, and took the approach to try to stay faithful to the spirit of the comics even if certain elements had to be changed. Fleischer noted that Lethal Protector gave the writers a "solid foundation" to explore the more heroic side of Venom, rather than their more traditional villainous side from the Spider-Man comics.

In Let There Be Carnage, Venom's characterization takes inspiration from the 1993 "Maximum Carnage" story arc and the 1996 story arc The Venom Saga from the 1994 Spider-Man animated series. Venom's access to a symbiote hive mind allowing knowledge to be shared across the multiverse, introduced in the film's mid-credits scene as an ability common to all symbiotes, originated from Edge of Venomverse #2 (July 2017) as an ability unique to the Venomized Gwen Poole.

== Reception ==
Hardy's performance received mixed reception upon Venom's release. He was praised as "wicked fun" and "fun to watch" by Matthew Rozsa at Salon and Time's Stephanie Zacharek, respectively. Writing for Variety, Owen Gleiberman criticized Hardy's performance as acting like a "stumblebum method goof", while Soren Anderson of The Seattle Times said that Hardy was "usually excellent" but "not this time". Jake Coyle from the Associated Press was not sure whether Hardy's performance "adds up to anything" in Venom.

=== Accolades ===
| Year | Film | Award | Category | Recipient(s) | Result | Ref(s) |
|---|---|---|---|---|---|---|
| 2019 | Venom | Los Angeles Online Film Critics Society Awards | Best Visual Effects or Animated Performance | Tom Hardy | Nominated | |
| 2019 | Venom | MTV Movie & TV Awards | Best Kiss | Tom Hardy (Note: Shared with Michelle Williams.) | Nominated | |
