= Peggy Lu =

American actress

- Education: University of Colorado Denver
- Occupations: Actress, pharmacist
- Years active: 1995–present

Peggy Lu is an American actress and pharmacist, best known for her role as convenience store entrepreneur and Venom host Mrs. Chen in the Sony's Spider-Man Universe (SSU) films Venom (2018), Venom: Let There Be Carnage (2021), Venom: The Last Dance (2024), the promotional web series Chen's Market (2021), and as a cameo role in Spider-Man: Across the Spider-Verse (2023).

Lu is the daughter of an immigrant couple who settled in the US. Before pursuing her acting dreams, Lu followed her parents’ advice to attend higher education. She received a doctorate in pharmacy from the University of Colorado Denver. She appeared in the film Now Chinatown, with Lu playing the role of Aunt Jiang. Lu also has appeared in numerous film and television series as a guest star, including Kung Pow: Enter the Fist, NCIS: Los Angeles, Animal Kingdom, and Always Be My Maybe, amongst others.

She is fluent in Mandarin and English.

== Filmography ==
Year	Title	Role	Notes
2000	Now Chinatown	Aunt Jiang	
2002	Kung Pow: Enter the Fist	Mother Chen	
2018	Venom	Mrs. Chen	
2019	Always Be My Maybe	Mrs. Tran	
2020	Run Sweetheart Run	Korean Woman	
2021	Venom: Let There Be Carnage	Mrs. Chen	
2021	Chen's Market	Mrs. Chen	Promotional web series
2023	Spider-Man: Across the Spider-Verse	Mrs. Chen	Archival footage
2024	Venom: The Last Dance	Mrs. Chen	
