= Venom (2018 film) =

American superhero film by Ruben Fleischer

- Theatrical release poster
- Directed by: Ruben Fleischer
- Screenplay by: Jeff Pinkner; Scott Rosenberg; Kelly Marcel
- Story by: Jeff Pinkner; Scott Rosenberg
- Based on: Marvel Comics
- Produced by: Avi Arad; Matt Tolmach; Amy Pascal
- Starring: Tom Hardy; Michelle Williams; Riz Ahmed; Scott Haze; Reid Scott
- Cinematography: Matthew Libatique
- Edited by: Maryann Brandon; Alan Baumgarten
- Music by: Ludwig Göransson
- Production companies: Columbia Pictures; Marvel Entertainment; Tencent Pictures; Arad Productions; Matt Tolmach Productions; Pascal Pictures
- Distributed by: Sony Pictures Releasing
- Release dates: October 1, 2018 (Regency Village Theater); October 5, 2018 (United States)
- Running time: 112 minutes
- Country: United States
- Language: English
- Budget: $100–116 million
- Box office: $856.1 million

Venom is a 2018 American superhero film based on the Marvel Comics character Eddie Brock / Venom. The first film in Sony's Spider-Man Universe (SSU), it was directed by Ruben Fleischer from a screenplay by Jeff Pinkner, Scott Rosenberg, and Kelly Marcel. Tom Hardy stars as Eddie Brock and Venom, alongside Michelle Williams, Riz Ahmed, Scott Haze, and Reid Scott. In the film, Eddie, a struggling journalist, gains superpowers after becoming the host of Venom, an alien symbiote whose species plans to invade Earth.

Following Venom's appearance in Spider-Man 3 (2007), Sony Pictures attempted to develop a spin-off film based on the Venom character, which was stalled due to issues with the company's ongoing Spider-Man franchise. In March 2016, work began on a new version that would start a new shared universe featuring the non-Spider-Man Marvel characters that the studio possessed film rights to. Sony also originally intended for the Venom film to share the world of the Marvel Cinematic Universe film Spider-Man: Homecoming (2017), but ultimately distanced the film from Spider-Man. Sony's Columbia Pictures produced the film in association with Marvel Entertainment. In March 2017, Rosenberg and Pinkner were set to write, with Fleischer and Hardy added in May; Marcel subsequently joined to rewrite the script. Filming took place from October 2017 to January 2018 in Atlanta, New York City, and San Francisco. The film was primarily inspired by the comic book miniseries Venom: Lethal Protector (1993) and the story arc "Planet of the Symbiotes" (1995). Ludwig Göransson was hired to compose the film's score, marking his second Marvel film after Black Panther (2018).

Venom premiered at the Regency Village Theater on October 1, 2018, and was released in the United States on October 5. Despite generally negative reviews from critics, Hardy's performance and his character's relationship with Venom were praised, and the film became the seventh-highest-grossing film of 2018, earning $856.1 million worldwide and setting several box office records for an October release. Two sequels have been released: Let There Be Carnage (2021) and The Last Dance (2024).

== Plot ==
While exploring space for new habitable worlds, a probe belonging to the bio-engineering corporation Life Foundation discovers a comet covered in symbiotic lifeforms. The probe returns to Earth with four samples, but one escapes and causes the ship to crash in Miri. The Life Foundation transports the other three to their research facility in San Francisco, where they discover that the symbiotes cannot survive without oxygen-breathing hosts, which often fatally reject the symbiosis. Investigative journalist Eddie Brock reads about the human trials in a classified document in the possession of his fiancée Anne Weying, an attorney preparing a lawsuit defense for the Life Foundation. Eddie confronts Life Foundation CEO Carlton Drake about the trials, leading to Eddie and Anne both losing their jobs and Anne ending her relationship with Eddie.

Six months later, one of Drake's symbiotes dies due to carelessness. Eddie is approached by Dora Skirth, one of Drake's scientists, who wants to expose him, disturbed by the human trials. She helps Eddie break into the facility to search for evidence, and he finds his friend Maria, held as one of the test subjects. He attempts to rescue her, but the symbiote possessing her transfers to his body instead, leaving her dead. Eddie escapes, immediately displaying strange symptoms. He reaches out to Anne and her new boyfriend, Dr. Dan Lewis for help. Due to Skirth's betrayal, Drake exposes her to the last captive symbiote, killing both. This leaves the symbiote inside Eddie as the only known surviving specimen.

Drake sends mercenaries to retrieve the symbiote from Eddie, but it manifests around his body as a monstrous creature that fights off the attackers. It introduces itself to Eddie as Venom and explains that the comet is searching for worlds where the symbiotes can possess and devour the inhabitants. Eddie breaks into his old boss' office to turn in evidence of Drake's crimes but is surrounded by SWAT officers. He escapes using the superhuman attributes the symbiote gives him. Anne takes Eddie to Dan, where they explain that the symbiote is rotting Eddie's internal organs. Eddie notes that the symbiote has two weaknesses: high-pitched noises and fire. Although Venom claims the organ damage can be reversed, Anne uses an MRI machine to separate him from Eddie, whom Drake's men then capture.

Meanwhile, the fourth symbiote, Riot, makes its way from Malaysia to San Francisco by hopping from body to body. It bonds with Drake, who agrees to take Riot in his space probe to bring back the rest of the symbiotes to Earth. Anne bonds with Venom so they can free Eddie. When Eddie and Venom are bonded again, the latter promises that he now wants to protect the Earth from his kind as he likes Eddie and wants to stay with him. After a lengthy battle with Riot, Venom damages the space probe as it takes off, causing it to explode and kill both Riot and Drake.

After the incident, Eddie returns to journalism, while Anne believes that Venom also died in the explosion. However, the pair remain secretly bonded and set out to protect San Francisco by devouring criminals. Eddie later interviews Cletus Kasady, an incarcerated serial killer who promises "carnage" when he escapes.

== Cast ==
- Tom Hardy as Eddie Brock / Venom:
  An investigative journalist who becomes the host of Venom, an alien symbiote that imbues him with super-human abilities. Director Ruben Fleischer said that unlike a werewolf or Jekyll and Hyde, the relationship between Eddie and the symbiote is a "hybrid", with the two characters sharing a body and working together. Hardy was drawn to this duality, and compared the pair to the animated characters Ren and Stimpy. Hardy gave Eddie an "aw-shucks American accent" while using a "James Brown lounge lizard"-like voice for Venom, that was later "modulated to sound more sinister". Hardy called Eddie an antihero who would "do whatever he has to" to accomplish a goal. Brad Venable provided additional voiceover for Venom's pain and grunting sounds, and his voice was combined with Hardy's for some dialogue, such as "We are Venom".
- Michelle Williams as Anne Weying:
  An attorney and Eddie's ex-fiancée. Williams was excited at the prospect of her character becoming She-Venom in the future as she does in the comics, and Fleischer felt that it would be fun to give fans an Easter egg of this by briefly showing the character host the symbiote during a scene in the film. This was kept a secret until the release of the film, and Fleischer hoped that the positive response to the appearance would lead to more She-Venom in future Venom films or even a standalone She-Venom film. Anne's line "I love you, but I love myself more" was added by Williams as a reference to the MeToo movement.
- Riz Ahmed as Carlton Drake / Riot:
  A genius inventor and leader of the Life Foundation experimenting on the symbiotes. Ahmed explained that Drake is trying to save the future of humanity when he discovers the symbiote, with Fleischer adding that Drake has a positive goal but a "moral ambiguity" that leads to him testing his science on other people. Drake is eventually bonded to another symbiote known as Riot, which Fleischer described as a "body-hopper".
- Scott Haze as Roland Treece: Drake's head of security.
- Reid Scott as Dan Lewis: Anne's new boyfriend, a doctor who tries to help Eddie.

Additionally, Jenny Slate portrays Life Foundation scientist Dora Skirth, Melora Walters plays Maria, a homeless woman who briefly hosts Venom, and Chris O'Hara appears as John Jameson, an astronaut who briefly hosts Riot. Also appearing are Sam Medina as a thug who Venom confronts, Peggy Lu as convenience store owner Mrs. Chen, Michelle Lee as a Malaysian EMT who briefly hosts Riot, Sope Aluko and Wayne Péré as Life Foundation scientists, Scott Deckert as Eddie's obnoxious neighbor, Emilio Rivera as a security guard Eddie is friends with, and Ron Cephas Jones, uncredited, as Eddie's boss. Woody Harrelson plays Cletus Kasady in the mid-credits scene, while Stan Lee makes a cameo appearance as a dog-walker who talks to Eddie. A clip from the animated film Spider-Man: Into the Spider-Verse (2018), featuring Shameik Moore as Miles Morales and Jake Johnson as Peter B. Parker, is included after the credits.

== Production ==
=== Development ===
==== Early attempts and cancellation ====
By 1997, David S. Goyer had written a script for a film featuring the Marvel Comics character Venom, which was to be produced by New Line Cinema. Dolph Lundgren was in talks to star in the film, which would feature the character Carnage as the main antagonist. The project did not move forward, and the film rights to the character moved to Sony Pictures along with those for the character Spider-Man, of whom Venom is an antagonist in the comics. Eddie Brock, the alter-ego of Venom, would appear in Sony's Spider-Man 3 (2007), with Topher Grace in the role. Grace was intended to only briefly appear as Eddie, but became a major villain as both Eddie and Venom because producer Avi Arad felt the series had relied too much on director Sam Raimi's personal favorite Spider-Man villains, and not characters that modern fans were actually interested in. Raimi had been hesitant to explore the character due to his "lack of humanity". Arad revealed plans for a spin-off film focused on Venom in July 2007.

Sony was actively developing Venom alongside direct sequels to Spider-Man 3 by July 2008, hoping the character could "add longevity" to the franchise in a similar fashion to Wolverine in 20th Century Fox's X-Men films. Jacob Estes had written a script for the film, but the studio chose to seek out new writers for a different approach from that draft. Estes's draft centered on Eddie trying to reinvent himself as a hero with the help of a tough waitress named Honey Horowitz. Eddie would have gone up against Cletus Kasady, depicted as an opera obsessed killer, who becomes Carnage after biting Eddie. Estes wrote the script with Grace in mind to return while Martin Donovan was his pick for Cletus, and Rashida Jones and Maya Rudolph for Honey. However, Sony was not yet convinced that Grace could serve as the lead actor in the film. That September, Sony hired Paul Wernick and Rhett Reese to write a new script, while industry insiders suggested that Grace should return for the spin-off "because the likeable actor could be a sympathetic evildoer", in response to Venom co-creator Todd McFarlane suggesting that a Venom film could not do well with a villain as the central character. Wernick and Reese had pitched an original story idea for the film to Sony, which Reese described as a "realistic, grounded, a little more dark take on the character". The pair then worked on an outline with Sony and Marvel, who "had specific rules about the villain and the backstory and stuff like that". They had completed a draft by April 2009, which included a role written specifically for Stan Lee, and featured a sequence where the Venom symbiote jumps "from body to body [through a city], and each person that it inhabits ends up becoming really violent and striking someone else and then it jumps to [them]".

He was a journalist [who] got in trouble for it ... the whole essence to us for the Marvel characters: stay close to the bible, stay close to the emotional story, and the rest is fun.

— Producer Matt Tolmach, on staying true to the character's comic-book origins when developing Venom

Wernick and Reese had turned in a second draft by September 2009, and Reese said that Sony was "pushing forward in whatever ways they push forward". A month later, Gary Ross, who was rewriting the script for Spider-Man 4 at the time, was hired to also rewrite the Venom script, as well as direct, and produce alongside Arad. Grace was "not considered likely" to return to the role then, with the film starting "from the drawing board" and looking to make the villain "an antihero who becomes a defender of the innocent". In January 2010, Sony announced that the Spider-Man franchise would be rebooted after Raimi decided to no longer pursue direct sequels to Spider-Man 3. By March 2012, Sony was still interested in a Venom film and wanted to use it to capitalize on the release of the first reboot film The Amazing Spider-Man (2012). The studio was in negotiations with Josh Trank to direct after Ross had left the project to direct The Hunger Games (2012). Trank was brought on following the release of Chronicle (2012), his directorial debut. He and Big Fan (2009) director Robert Siegel pitched an R-rated Venom film in the vein of The Mask (1994), but producer Matt Tolmach disliked their treatment. In June, Arad and Tolmach discussed Venom connecting to The Amazing Spider-Man, similar to the Marvel Cinematic Universe (MCU) films crossing over in The Avengers (2012). Arad called it "an Eddie Brock story" only, but Tolmach added, "Hopefully all these worlds will live together in peace someday".

In December 2013, Sony revealed plans to use The Amazing Spider-Man 2 (2014) to establish their own expanded universe based on the Marvel properties the studio had the film rights to, including Venom. Arad and Tolmach would produce the films as part of a franchise brain trust, with Alex Kurtzman, Roberto Orci, and Ed Solomon set to write the screenplay for Venom, and Kurtzman set to direct. In April 2014, Arad and Tolmach said Venom would be released after The Amazing Spider-Man 3—which was set for release on May 27, 2016—but before The Amazing Spider-Man 4. However, The Amazing Spider-Man 2 underperformed, and, with Sony "under tremendous pressure to perform [that had them taking] a hard look at their most important franchise", the direction of the shared universe was rethought. The Amazing Spider-Man 3 was pushed back to 2018, and the Venom film, now known as Venom Carnage, was moved up to 2017. Kurtzman was still attached to direct, and write alongside Solomon. In February 2015, Sony and Marvel Studios announced a new partnership that would see Marvel Studios produce the next Spider-Man film for Sony, and integrate the character into their MCU. Sony still planned to produce the spin-off films on their own, but by November they were believed to have been canceled so Sony could focus on its new reboot with Marvel Studios.

==== Revival ====
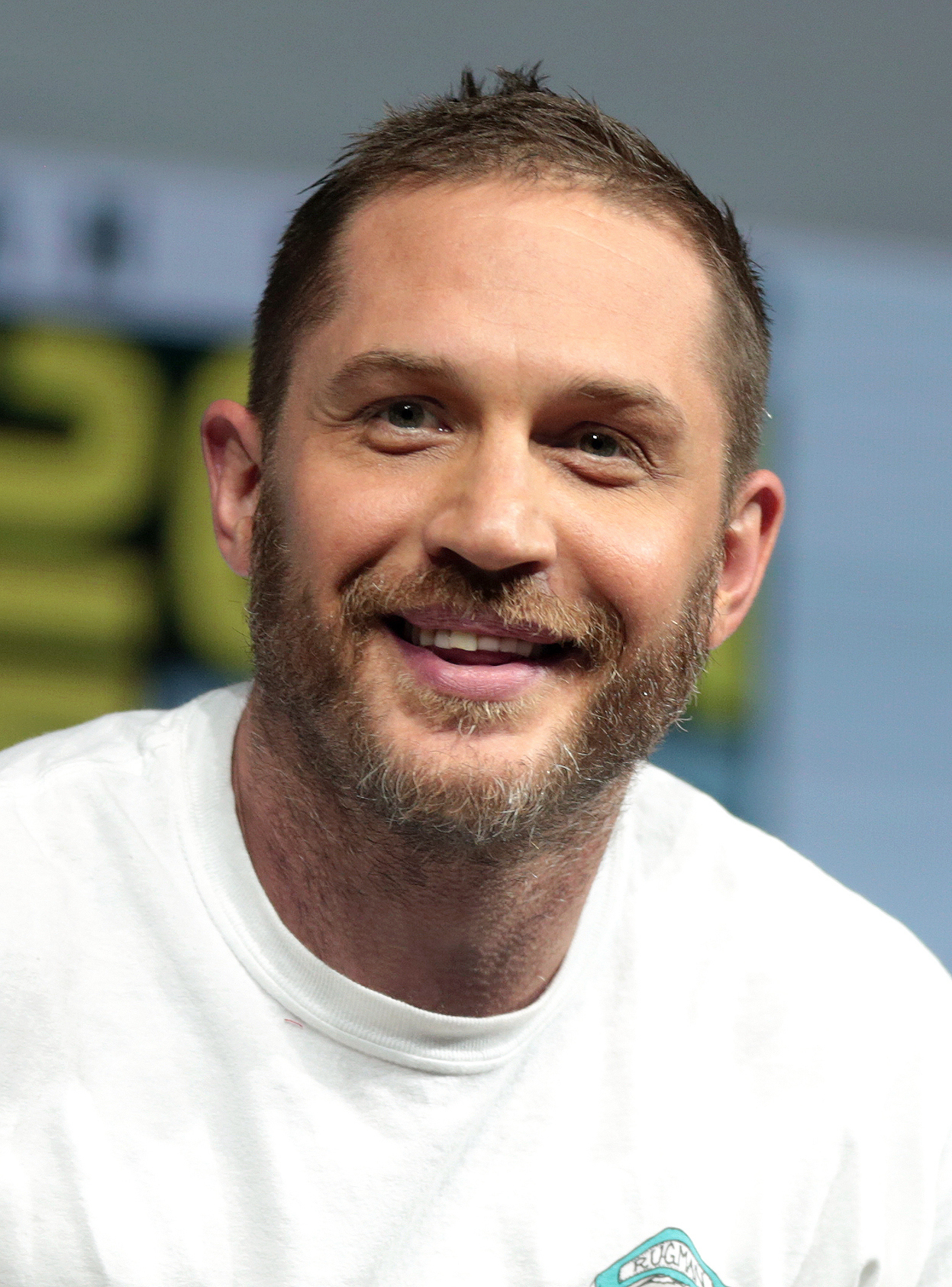
When he was approached about starring in the film, Tom Hardy was already interested in Venom due to his son's love for the character.

Venom was revived by Sony in March 2016, with Arad and Tolmach producing, and Dante Harper writing a new screenplay. The project was envisioned as a standalone film launching its own franchise, unrelated to Sony and Marvel Studios' new Spider-Man films. A year later, Sony gave the film an October 5, 2018, release date, and explained that Kurtzman was not involved with the new project. No new director had been signed, and Scott Rosenberg and Jeff Pinkner were now writing the screenplay. Venom was expected to begin a new shared universe independent of the MCU, and was initially aiming for an R-rating on a smaller budget, inspired by 20th Century Fox's success doing so with the X-Men films Deadpool (2016) and Logan (2017). Sony's director shortlist for the film was believed to include Adi Shankar, known for his dark, R-rated takes "on the properties he grew up on", and Adam Wingard. In May, Sony announced that Tom Hardy would star as Eddie Brock and Venom in Venom, to be directed by Ruben Fleischer and officially begin a new shared universe, later titled "Sony's Spider-Man Universe". Fleischer was chosen after a long search by Sony, and as a longtime fan of the character expressed excitement at the visual possibilities of portraying Venom on film and the potential thematic ideas associated with the character such as duality. David F. Sandberg met with Sony beforehand to discuss the possibility of directing the film, reading its script and meeting with them, but Sandberg had already been approached by Warner Bros. to make the DC Extended Universe (DCEU) film Shazam! (2019), preferring to direct Shazam! over Venom due to that film's crew consisting of people Sandberg had worked with at New Line Cinema. The casting of Hardy, whose son was a big fan of Venom, happened quickly after he left director J. C. Chandor's Triple Frontier (2019) in April and Sony "saw an opportunity to court an in-demand talent". Hardy was paid $7 million for his involvement. Hardy practiced mixed martial arts, boxing, and jiu-jitsu for five weeks for the role.

=== Pre-production ===
Riz Ahmed was in talks to join the film in August 2017, with Matt Smith, Pedro Pascal, and Matthias Schoenaerts all having been considered for the same role. In September, Michelle Williams entered talks to join the film as a district attorney and Eddie's love interest. Tatiana Maslany and Lashana Lynch also auditioned for roles. By October, Jenny Slate, Reid Scott, and Scott Haze were in negotiations to join as well, with Slate up for a role as a scientist. Also at that time, Kelly Marcel was writing the latest draft of the film's script. The final budget that Sony allocated for the film's production was $100 million, though Deadline Hollywood revealed in September 2018 that a deal between Sony and Chinese production company Tencent Pictures meant the latter had ultimately covered a third of these production costs for the studio.

==== Writing and Spider-Man connection ====
In June 2017, Marvel Studios president Kevin Feige confirmed that Venom was solely a Sony project and Marvel Studios had no plans to connect it with the MCU. However, producer Amy Pascal soon clarified that Sony intended to have their films take place in "the same world" as the new MCU film Spider-Man: Homecoming (2017), describing them as "adjunct" to that world. She said that Venom would connect to the next planned film in their shared universe, Silver & Black, and that there was potential for Tom Holland's Spider-Man to appear in either. Carnage was also expected to appear in Venom at that point. In July, Columbia Pictures president Sanford Panitch explained that Sony was not interested in producing "conventional comic-book movies" and was looking to give each film in the series a distinct style. Venom was considered "a spin on a horror film", inspired by the works of John Carpenter and David Cronenberg, but with "more pop and fun". Fleischer said he has "always been drawn to the more antihero superheroes. There's a dark element to [Venom] and a wit that has always appealed to me". He said the film would explore Venom's origins and the "Jekyll and Hyde" relationship that Eddie has with the symbiote.

You're Eddie Brock. I'm the symbiote. Together we are Venom.

— Director Ruben Fleischer was inspired by this comic quote for the film's depiction of the title character

The film is primarily based on the Venom: Lethal Protector miniseries (1993) and the "Planet of the Symbiotes" story arc (1995), borrowing the San Francisco setting of the former. Spider-Man ultimately could not be included in the film because of Sony's deal loaning the character to Marvel Studios, challenging the writers to "make a movie with a character that's defined by Spider-Man without Spider-Man". For this reason, they looked to the Ultimate Marvel version of Venom—whose origin is not tied to Spider-Man—for inspiration. Pinkner and Rosenberg were told that Spider-Man could not be in Venom before they made their initial pitch for the film, and took the approach of trying to stay faithful to the spirit of the comics even if certain elements had to be changed, such as having Eddie cross a moral line in his journalism which the character does in his comic book origin story. Fleischer noted that Lethal Protector aided in this goal since it, as the first solo Venom comic book series, had "broke [the character] free from Spider-Man". It also gave the writers a "solid foundation" to explore the more heroic side of Venom, rather than his more traditional villainous side from the Spider-Man comics, though Fleischer later described the film as having "no heroes". One of Venom's lines in the film, "Eyes, lungs, pancreas ... so many snacks, so little time", was lifted unaltered from The Amazing Spider-Man #374 (February 1993).

Fleischer stated that they were planning a "huge world" with many characters while developing the film, including other symbiotes such as the villain Riot. Fleischer wanted Venom to stand out compared to other comic book-based films, and felt that tonally it would not remind viewers of the lighter MCU or the somber DCEU. It was important for him to honor the violence of Venom from the comics, where "he bites people's heads off and eats brains. It would be weird to make a movie with Venom if he wasn't doing that". Sony executives were reluctant to push this element so far that the film would earn an R-rating, which they believed would cause problems for potential crossovers with the family-friendly Spider-Man, as well as other MCU characters, in future films. Venom was eventually rated PG-13, with the violence toned down.

=== Filming ===
Principal photography began on October 23, 2017, with filming taking place in Atlanta and New York City. Matthew Libatique served as director of photography, while Oliver Scholl served as production designer after also doing so for Spider-Man: Homecoming. Williams was confirmed to have joined the film in November, with Sony organizing her filming schedule to ensure her availability for concurrent, unexpected reshoots on All the Money in the World (2017). By December, Woody Harrelson was in talks to appear in the film, and Williams was revealed to be portraying Anne Weying. According to several reports, Tom Holland spent several days during Venom's production filming a cameo appearance as Peter Parker / Spider-Man for the film, but Marvel Studios asked Sony to exclude the scene from the final film.

Conversely, Adam B. Vary reported in December 2024 that according to one Sony source, Disney never prevented Sony from using either the Peter Parker / Spider-Man character nor Holland in the Venom franchise, especially since the Sony Pictures Animation feature film Spider-Man: Into the Spider-Verse (2018) featured multiple versions of Spider-Man. Despite that, Sony opted not to include Holland, as the studio felt that audiences would not accept Holland's Spider-Man appearing in non-MCU films or would be confused by it, especially after Spider-Man: No Way Home (2021) and Doctor Strange in the Multiverse of Madness (2022) established the boundaries of the MCU's multiverse.

Hardy recorded his lines for the symbiote at the beginning of each day, and these were played back to him through an earpiece on set during scenes where Eddie and the symbiote talk to each other. Hardy had previously used this process when he played twins in Legend (2015). Fleischer allowed Hardy to improvise on set, and take the scenes where he felt they needed to go. For instance, Hardy noticed that a restaurant set for one scene had a lobster tank in it and decided that his character would get into the tank in the scene; the production design team had to work overnight to reinforce the tank and fill it with fake lobsters so Hardy could get in it the next day. Hardy also worked with Marcel to rewrite some of his dialogue for both Eddie and Venom throughout the filming process. Additional filming took place in San Francisco from January 16 to 26, 2018. Locations included Russian Hill, North Beach, Chinatown, and the Financial District. Hardy wrapped filming on January 27.

=== Post-production ===
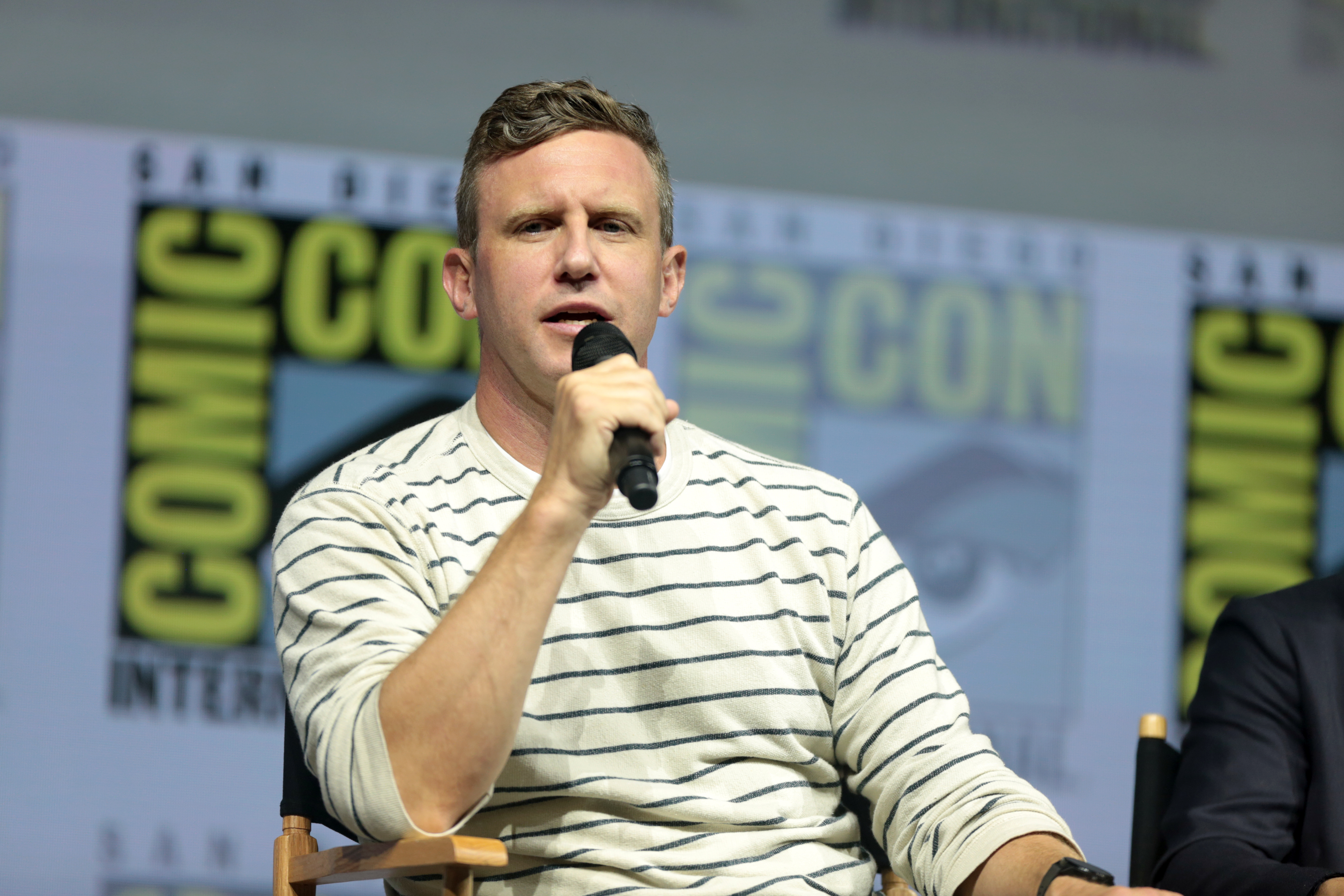
Fleischer promoting Venom at San Diego Comic-Con in July 2018

Ahmed and Scott were confirmed to appear in the film in February 2018, and Will Beall was revealed to have done additional writing on the script. In the following months, Sope Aluko and Scott Deckert were revealed to be cast in the film, Haze and Harrelson were also confirmed to appear, and Ahmed was revealed to be playing Carlton Drake. Harrelson, who previously worked with Fleischer on Zombieland (2009), signed on to the film for a small role—he described himself as being "in a little fraction of this movie"—knowing that he would have a bigger part in a potential sequel. The role was revealed to be that of Cletus Kasady, the alter-ego of Carnage.

The film underwent reshoots in Los Angeles in June 2018, which were reportedly overseen by Hardy. Venom was one of the first films to take advantage of the new post-production facilities at Sony Pictures' Stage 6 building in Culver City, California, with two new theaters equipped for sound design using Dolby Atmos technology, two new stages for sound mixing with Avid Technology's Pro Tools workstations, and a theater set-up for remote visual effects and color grading review. Maryann Brandon and Alan Baumgarten served as editors for the film. Fleischer's focus during the editing process was to "cultivate" the relationship between Eddie and Venom, which he felt was the core of the film. The opening of the film went through several iterations, but Fleischer always wanted it to "start with a bang", which led to a spaceship crash in the opening scene. The Venom symbiote is shown shortly after as an introduction of the film's "hero", before the villain's plot begins and becomes the focus of the scene.

==== Visual effects and design ====
DNEG provided the visual effects for the film, with Paul Franklin serving as visual effects supervisor on the project, and Paolo Giandoso drawing concept art for the DNEG design team. Giandoso helped design Venom and Riot, and provided a sequence of 158 drawings for the film's final battle between the two characters.

The visual effects team's first step was to define the look of the different symbiotes in the film, which do not have a defined body shape. Franklin explained that they wanted the creatures to be "predatory and threatening", and looked at slime molds, jellyfish, and time-lapse photography of amoeba for inspiration. The final models were blobs that could move and change shape, with soft tissue simulated on top to give the creatures an "interesting abstract quality". The symbiote is combined with Eddie by adding "tentacles" to Hardy, which was done through a hybrid of practical and visual effects. The tentacles were inspired by the movement of sea creatures and scientific demonstrations of non-Newtonian fluid. Additional cameras on set accurately captured Hardy's movements so the tentacles could be integrated with his performance. A detailed digital double of Hardy was also used for the integration. Other partial Venom forms include the "freak-out" form for when he is being vibrated out of Eddie, for which a "ghostly" effect was created by adding an animated version of the character on top of Hardy's performance with a vibration effect; and the "wraith" Venom, where Venom's head emerges from Eddie's body to talk to him—this form was closer to the raw symbiote than the final Venom design, with added tendrils and veins to an overall snake-like shape, and an emaciated take on Venom's face.

The humanoid Venom character was created with a digital model that included rigs and simulation for the face and muscles. Venom is portrayed as being 7 feet 7 inches (231 cm) tall and weighing 500 pounds (230 kg), with a "smooth, oily, black" appearance. Due to the differences in the character's facial design comic-to-comic, and even panel-to-panel, the designers "distilled the essential elements" into a design that could be photorealistic. These included the character's eyes, which Franklin compared to those of a killer whale and explained had to be animated in a more exaggerated way to indicate where the character was looking since he does not have pupils. The character's long tongue is also adapted from the comics, with another complex rig required so the tongue could be specifically animated, and then retract to allow the character to talk without having to speak around it, which Franklin said was "too comical". When he does speak, Venom often talks through clenched teeth. This was inspired by actors Jack Palance and Clint Eastwood. Since Venom's origin is not tied to Spider-Man in the film, it did not make sense for the filmmakers to add a version of Spider-Man's symbol to Venom's chest as he has in the comics. However, an all-black character would have been difficult to see in night scenes, so Venom has a subtle 'V' symbol on his chest instead which is formed from the white veins of the symbiote. To further help the audience see the character, the visual effects team lit him like they would a car in a commercial, using reflections to help define his body. The character model was flexible, allowing animators to scale Venom's head, adjust the length of his teeth, or even unhinge his jaw "like a trap door", depending on the pose required. Hardy initially planned to use performance capture to portray Venom on-set in addition to Eddie, but this idea was abandoned due to the difference between his face and the character's. A 6-foot-10-inch (208 cm) stand-in wearing a helmet for added height was sometimes used on-set as a reference for Venom.

Because Riot is a minor character from the comics, the designers had more freedom to develop his film appearance. He is a foot taller than Venom, and almost twice as heavy, with a "brutal metallic look" that Franklin described as "almost reptilian". The character model for Riot was similar to the one for Venom, but had less effects layers due to Riot not having the same "rippling goo" texture. The villain also had a custom set of effects for the different weapons that he can manifest, including blades and a large wrecking ball with spikes. The final fight between the two characters was constantly changing, with Franklin, DNEG, and the previsualization team at The Third Floor working with Fleischer to develop the fight. One element that was suggested by the visual effects teams was to take advantage of the characters' liquid-like designs by having the two appear to merge and create "a swirling mass of symbiotic flesh, with the two humans revealed through the whirlpool". This was inspired by the early tests made while developing the basic symbiote look. When designing the launch pad where the fight is set, Franklin said that it needed to be "broad, colorful and exciting" to represent the more comedic and comic book-like style of the film, which he contrasted to his work on Interstellar (2014) and the concurrent work being done for First Man (2018). Additional environment work that DNEG completed included the removal of Coca-Cola signs and CNN logos from the Atlanta-shot sequences, since San Francisco does not have those. For Anne's brief time as She-Venom, Franklin said that the various depictions of the character in the comics ranged from "demonic creatures with elongated teeth through to the extreme hypertrophied female form", with the film's version trying to balance being disgusting and "a little bit sexy", particular for when she kisses Eddie. In total, DNEG completed around 1,100 visual effects shots for the film.

== Music ==
Ludwig Göransson signed on to compose the score for Venom in March 2018, reuniting with Fleischer after the pair worked together on 30 Minutes or Less (2011). In August, rapper Eminem teased that he had contributed a new song to the soundtrack of the film. His tenth studio album Kamikaze was released at the end of that month, and features a bonus song titled "Venom" that references the film. The song was released as a digital single on September 21. An album featuring Göransson's score was released digitally by Sony Classical Records on October 5, with a physical release later that month.

== Marketing ==
For the Sony Pictures panel at Comic Con Experience 2017, Fleischer and Hardy appeared in a video from the film's set to promote it. A teaser for the film was released in February 2018. Dani Di Placido of Forbes called it "comically underwhelming". He felt this was a major misstep by Sony given the teaser was meant to win over uninterested Spider-Man fans, particularly after the character's portrayal in Spider-Man 3. The fact that the teaser did not include the title character was a common criticism by commentators. Sony chairman Tom Rothman later acknowledged this, explaining that the intention had been to "heighten anticipation" for the film. In August, Fleischer revealed the trailer did not showcase Venom because the visual effects for the character were incomplete at the time.

Rothman presented new footage of the film at CinemaCon 2018, and acknowledged that it revealed the film's version of Venom by saying, "See, we didn't forget to put Venom in the movie!" Di Placido was more positive of this trailer, praising the appearance of and visuals for Venom, but being concerned about the dialogue. During the trailer, actress Jenny Slate pronounces the word symbiote as SIM-bye-oht rather than SIM-bee-oht, as many commentators believed it should be pronounced. This led to widespread criticism and a 35,700 percent increase in searches for "symbiote pronunciation", according to Merriam-Webster, which noted both pronunciations are technically considered acceptable. Slate uses the expected SIM-bee-oht pronunciation in the final film, which commentators assumed was achieved through reshoots or overdubbing, but Fleischer explained that the pronunciation had been corrected on set and the marketing team had simply used a take for the trailer from before the correction was made. Hannah Shaw-Williams of Screen Rant noted that the trailer reused music from a major, recently released trailer for the Marvel Studios film Avengers: Infinity War (2018), questioning whether this was a coincidence or if Sony was "deliberately trying to tie Venom to the MCU in the minds of audiences. Whatever the reason, Venom will need more than just a familiar piece of trailer music in order to win over audiences". According to Fizziology, an analytics company that takes different social media platforms into account, the second trailer was watched 64.3 million times within 24 hours, a 72 percent increase over the first trailer. Fizziology said it was rare for a second trailer to get more views than the first and noted that general positive responses were up 46 percent. The majority of positive responses were directed towards the appearance and design of Venom.

Fleischer, Hardy, and Ahmed promoted the film at the 2018 San Diego Comic-Con, where the audience was given Venom masks and chanted "We are Venom". New footage from the film was debuted at the panel, including the reveal of the villainous symbiote Riot. A third trailer was subsequently released online. It was criticized by Scott Mendelson (also of Forbes), who said the film was looking comparable to Catwoman (2004)—"the shining example of how not to do this kind of movie". He also felt that Fleischer's decision to make a sequel to his successful film Zombieland before Venom's release was an indication that the film was not going to be good. Richard Newby, writing for The Hollywood Reporter, felt the film was being marketed as if it was in an "earlier era", saying it "looks pre-Iron Man cool" and more like a cross between An American Werewolf in London (1981) and Blade (1998) than a modern superhero film. He noted that despite early fears, the latest trailer showed that Venom would be featured throughout the film, and believed that the film's lack of shared universe connections and distinct tone could help Sony prove it has "a handle on these characters after all". A tie-in comic book, serving as both a prequel and a teaser for the film and simply titled Venom, was released digitally by Marvel Comics on September 14, with a physical version available to those who purchased tickets for the film from AMC Theatres. Written by Sean Ryan and illustrated by Szymon Kudranski, the comic establishes the film's backstory for the symbiote. SKAN provided the cover art for the comic.

== Release ==
=== Theatrical ===
Venom had its world premiere at the Regency Village Theatre in Westwood, Los Angeles, on October 1, 2018, and was theatrically released in the United States and Canada on October 5 in 4,250 theaters. This followed a release in several other countries on October 3, where it was playing on 20,800 screens internationally in its opening weekend, along with 726 IMAX theaters in 60 markets.

The film was released in China on November 9, a date that was approved by the country's film board following an unexpected drop in box office sales there earlier in 2018. China granted the film a rare extended theatrical release in December, with the film's box office success and Tencent's large investment in the film considered contributing factors in the decision. The extension added 30 days to the film's initial 30-day run.

=== Home media ===
Sony Pictures Home Entertainment released a digital version of the film on December 11, 2018, with Ultra HD Blu-ray, Blu-ray, and DVD versions released on December 18 in the United States. The physical releases featured deleted and extended scenes, making-of featurettes, and a way of watching the film called "Venom Mode" in which informative pop-ups appear on screen. For these home media releases, the film was framed as a romantic comedy by Sony with a focus on the relationship between Eddie and Venom.

In April 2021, Sony signed a deal with Disney giving them access to their legacy content, including Marvel content in Sony's Spider-Man Universe, to stream on Disney+ and Hulu and appear on Disney's linear television networks. Disney's access to Sony's titles would come following their availability on Netflix.

The film was released on Disney+ on May 12, 2023, in the United States and later on in Canada on September 8, 2023.

== Reception ==
=== Box office ===
Venom grossed $213.5 million in the United States and Canada, and $642.5 million in other territories, for a total worldwide gross of $856.1 million. With a production budget between $100–116 million, Deadline Hollywood reported that the film needed to gross around $350 million to break even, and later calculated the net profit to be $246.9 million, when factoring together all expenses and revenues, making it the sixth-most-profitable release of 2018.

In the United States and Canada, Venom was initially projected to gross $60–70 million in its opening weekend. It made $10 million from Thursday night previews, the highest ever for an October release (beating Paranormal Activity 3's $8 million in 2011). After making $32.7 million on its first day, weekend estimates were raised to $80 million. It went on to gross $80.3 million, marking the best October opening weekend of all time (beating Gravity's $55.8 million in 2013), as well as the seventh-best opening for a Sony film. The film made $9.6 million on Columbus Day to set the record for the best Monday gross in October, again topping Gravity. The film remained in first the following weekend, dropping 55% to $35.7 million. It finished in third place in its third and fourth weekends behind Halloween and A Star Is Born. With the release of more films in its fifth and sixth weekends, Venom fell to, respectively, sixth and eighth place, with the latter carrying the film over $200 million total.

Worldwide, the film was expected to debut to $160–175 million, including $100–110 million from 58 territories outside of the U.S. and Canada. It over-performed with $125.2 million from foreign territories for a global opening weekend of $205.5 million, the highest ever in October. It finished first in all countries but one, including South Korea ($16.4 million over its five-day debut), Russia ($13.6 million), the United Kingdom ($10.5 million) and Mexico ($10.2 million, the best start for a Sony film in the country). The opening included $15.4 million from IMAX, the largest opening for October and Sony in the format; of that, $7 million was from overseas IMAX screens, the largest overseas IMAX debut. Venom remained the top film worldwide for its second and third weekends. In its second, the film opened at number one in France ($6.7 million), Vietnam ($3 million), and Thailand ($2.2 million), and remained number one in 51 others, including Brazil which dropped only 6% from the first weekend. The film was number one in 30 markets for the third weekend. It opened in Japan at number one with $5.2 million during its fifth weekend, taking the worldwide total to $541.6 million. The film's top overseas markets then, ahead of its release in China, were Russia ($31.6 million), South Korea ($30.1 million), the UK ($25.5 million), Mexico ($23.8 million), and France/Brazil (tied at $18.3 million).

The film passed $600 million and became number one worldwide again after opening in China with $111 million. It was Sony's biggest opening in China, the second-largest for a superhero film behind Avengers: Infinity War, and the fifth-largest for any imported film to the country. $34.9 million came on the Friday, which was the biggest opening day for a solo Marvel film. The 553 IMAX screens in the country made $10 million, the largest November opening for the format in China, and the eight-largest for any month. The film held off new release Fantastic Beasts: The Crimes of Grindelwald in its second weekend, which became number one overall, to remain top in China with the best second weekend for a superhero film in the country at $51.2 million. Following this "phenomenal" performance in China, the film crossed $800 million the next weekend with another $21.3 million from 63 markets, reaching $822.5 million to become the second-biggest superhero origin film ever behind Black Panther. At the start of December and following the film receiving an extension for its China release, Mendelson wrote that the film had made an "insane" $262 million in China, and felt that it had outperformed other films such as Crazy Rich Asians in the market due to being more "quirky/weird" with some "camp classic 'so bad it's good' stylings" that those other films did not have.

=== Critical response ===
The review aggregation website Rotten Tomatoes reports an approval rating of 31% based on 365 reviews and an average rating of 4.5/10. The website's critical consensus reads, "Venom's first standalone movie turns out to be like the comics character in all the wrong ways—chaotic, noisy, and in desperate need of a stronger attachment to Spider-Man." Metacritic, which uses a weighted average, assigned the film a score of 35 out of 100, based on 46 critics, indicating "generally unfavorable reviews". Critics generally criticized the film for its dullness, finding its plot messy and tone incoherent. Hardy's performance as Eddie received mixed reviews, though the actor's relationship with Venom was praised.

Reviewing the film for Variety, Owen Gleiberman called it "a textbook case of a comic-book film that's unexciting in its ho-hum competence, and even its visual-effects bravura". He criticized Hardy's performance as acting like "a stumblebum Method goof", and felt the film spent too long on Venom's origin story when it should have been what a sequel likely will be. He added that the film may not be as bad a start to a new shared universe as The Mummy (2017), but it "could turn out to be a similar case of a franchise kickoff that doesn't fully attain franchise liftoff". Ty Burr of The Boston Globe scored the film one-and-a-half stars and said it "saps the life force of almost everyone in it" including Hardy, Williams, and Ahmed, all of whose performances he criticized. He also criticized Fleischer's direction as "unfocused" and Libatique's cinematography as some of the "dingiest" of 2018, but did feel that the scenes where Hardy and Venom talk while sharing a body were "reasonably amusing". Mark Daniell at the Toronto Sun criticized the film's tone, effects, and characters, compared it to a rejected superhero film treatment from the 1990s, and said it was the worst Marvel film released since Elektra (2005).

Like Burr, Soren Anderson of The Seattle Times also gave the film one-and-a-half stars, calling it "perhaps the worst Marvel-derived origin story ever", and criticizing the "close to an hour of tedium" before Venom appears in the film. Anderson also said that Hardy was "usually excellent (but not this time)", and called the action sequences "generic". At the Toronto Star, Peter Howell gave Venom two out of four stars and said that Hardy's performance prevented it from being "an unwatchable disaster", but he still thought the film was a mess with an inconsistent tone, "bog-level computer effects and washed-out colours resembling those of a 1998 sci-fi movie on a VHS tape that's been left out in the sun". Jake Coyle for the Associated Press found the film to be "kind of a hoot" despite it being "an incoherent mess of tones, acting styles and visual effects". He was particularly positive about the film's differences from other Marvel films, and of how Hardy pushed it to be more comedic seemingly against Fleischer's intentions. On Hardy's performance, Coyle was not sure whether it "adds up to anything in Venom. But it's something to behold. Train wrecks like these aren't supposed to be this entertaining."

David Edelstein at Vulture said Hardy was the only reason to watch the film, and felt having Eddie and Venom share a body was "a good gimmick" that was executed better by Steve Martin in All of Me (1984). He also thought that Williams and Slate were wasted in their respective roles in the film, and that Fleischer's direction was "competent and unmemorable". Writing for Salon, Matthew Rozsa said that he actually liked the film, and might have loved it if not for the "sloppy and formulaic script". He felt the depiction of Venom was more worthy to be seen in a film than the version in Spider-Man 3, and praised Hardy's performance as "wicked fun". Rozsa especially liked that the film did not take itself too seriously and did not attempt to set-up an entire shared universe on its own, positively comparing it to the sort of superhero film that would have been made before the release of the MCU's Iron Man. Time's Stephanie Zacharek described the film as "neither the most super-awesome Marvel movie nor the worst", criticizing the action and small roles of Williams and Slate, but praising the design of the symbiotes as "kind of neat to look at" and Hardy's performance as "fun to watch".

=== Audience response ===
Audiences polled by CinemaScore gave the film an average grade of "B+" on an A+ to F scale, and those at PostTrak gave it an 80% positive score, while the social media monitor RelishMix noted online responses to the film were "mixed [...] leaning positive". During the film's opening week, most audience members surveyed by Fandango wanted to see the film because it featured a Marvel antihero, because it had the potential to crossover with Spider-Man, or because they were fans of Hardy.

==== "SymBrock" shipping ====
After seeing the film, Kate Gardner of The Mary Sue wondered whether it had been queer coded, a term referring to characters appearing queer without their sexuality being a part of the story. Gardner soon noticed fan art depicting Eddie and Venom as a couple appearing across social media sites. She acknowledged that there were several moments throughout the film that implied such a relationship, including Venom deciding to turn against his species because of his time spent with Eddie and Venom deciding to French kiss Eddie when it is transferring from Anne's body to Eddie's. Gardner felt that these elements made it more logical for fans to "ship" the two characters than some similar pairings that had become popular on the internet. Many of the fans posting the art and discussing the characters' relationship online began using the name "SymBrock" to refer to them.

Tumblr's Fandometrics analysis team, led by Senior Content Insights Manager Amanda Brennan, looked at "original posts, likes, reblogs, and comments" across the website's 440 million blogs, and reported that SymBrock was the most used ship name during the week ending October 15. It was also the eighth most popular topic overall, while Venom itself was the most popular topic. Brennan said that fans of SymBrock existed before the film due to the nature of the comics, but the increase in popularity was undoubtedly due to the film's portrayal of the characters which she said made Venom's dialogue more "casual ... compared to how he speaks in comics, which kind of makes it more approachable and easier to turn the symbiote into something cute". Brennan added that dialogue such as "I am Venom and you are mine" was deemed to be particularly romantic by these fans, as was the idea that Venom be seen not as a parasite but as someone who "chose Eddie Brock and has a connection to Eddie Brock". According to Fandometrics, SymBrock remained the most popular shipping name on Tumblr for the weeks ending October 22, October 29, November 5, and November 12, before falling to third place during the week ending November 19. In its list of the top 100 shipping names of 2018, released on November 28, Fandometrics listed SymBrock in fourteenth place.

When Sony began advertising the home media release of the film by presenting it as a romantic comedy focused on Eddie and Venom's relationship, io9's Charles Pulliam-Moore said it was the treatment that the film deserved, and attributed the change in strategy from the studio to the audience's response to the relationship. He added that it was rare for a film studio to "get on top of a so-so ad campaign" by adjusting towards "the public's reaction to a movie", and that he believed it to have been successful. Michael Walsh at Nerdist concurred with Pulliam-Moore, describing the move as "fully embrac[ing] 'SymBrock'" and calling it "brilliant". Walsh said that though the advertisement was clearly a parody, it also "feels like a far more accurate portrayal of what the movie was really like than the initial [marketing] hinted at", and further highlighted the kissing scene.

=== Accolades ===
Accolades received by Venom
Award	Date of ceremony	Category	Recipient(s)	Result	Ref.
Los Angeles Online Film Critics Society Awards	January 9, 2019	Best Visual Effects or Animated Performance	Tom Hardy	Nominated	
Visual Effects Society Awards	February 5, 2019	Outstanding Effects Simulations in a Photoreal Feature	Aharon Bourland, Jordan Walsh, Aleksandar Chalyovski, Federico Frassinelli	Nominated	
Taurus World Stunt Awards	May 11, 2019	Best Work With a Vehicle	Jack Gill, Henry Kingi Sr., Jalil Jay Lynch, Denney Pierce, and Jimmy N. Roberts	Won	
Taurus World Stunt Awards	May 11, 2019	Best Specialty Stunt	Joe Dryden and Jimmy N. Roberts	Nominated	
Taurus World Stunt Awards	May 11, 2019	Best Stunt Coordinator and/or 2nd Unit Director	Andy Gill, Jack Gill, Chris O'Hara, and Spiro Razatos	Nominated	
Golden Trailer Awards	May 29, 2019	Best Action TV Spot	"Control" (Wild Card)	Nominated	
Golden Trailer Awards	May 29, 2019	Best Voice Over TV Spot	"Control" (Wild Card)	Nominated	
Golden Trailer Awards	May 29, 2019	Best Wildposts	"Wildposts" (LA/Lindeman Associates)	Nominated	
MTV Movie & TV Awards	June 17, 2019	Best Kiss	Tom Hardy and Michelle Williams (Eddie Brock and Venom, Anne Weying)	Nominated	

== Sequels ==
A sequel, Venom: Let There Be Carnage, was released on October 1, 2021. Hardy, Harrelson, and Williams reprised the roles in the film, while Fleischer did not return due to his commitments of directing Zombieland: Double Tap (2019). Marcel was hired as writer. Andy Serkis was hired to direct in August 2019. Fleischer said he was happy to let Serkis take over following the negative critical reaction that Venom received. Fleischer believed reviewers had been unfair to the "crowdpleasing movie", potentially due to biases against Sony and towards Marvel Studios' rival superhero films.

In December 2021, Pascal said they were in the "planning stages" of Venom 3. Sony confirmed the film was in development at CinemaCon in April 2022. In June, Hardy revealed that Marcel was writing the script after previously working on the prior Venom films, and that he was co-writing the story with her. That October, Marcel was set to make her directorial debut with the film and also produced it. Venom: The Last Dance was released on October 25, 2024.
