= Venom: Let There Be Carnage =

2021 American superhero film by Andy Serkis

- Theatrical release poster
- Directed by: Andy Serkis
- Screenplay by: Kelly Marcel
- Story by: Tom Hardy; Kelly Marcel
- Based on: Marvel Comics
- Produced by: Avi Arad; Matt Tolmach; Amy Pascal; Kelly Marcel; Tom Hardy; Hutch Parker
- Starring: Tom Hardy; Michelle Williams; Naomie Harris; Reid Scott; Stephen Graham; Woody Harrelson
- Cinematography: Robert Richardson
- Edited by: Maryann Brandon; Stan Salfas
- Music by: Marco Beltrami
- Production companies: Columbia Pictures; Marvel Entertainment; Arad Productions; Matt Tolmach Productions; Pascal Pictures
- Distributed by: Sony Pictures Releasing
- Release dates: September 14, 2021 (London); October 1, 2021 (United States)
- Running time: 97 minutes
- Country: United States
- Language: English
- Budget: $110 million
- Box office: $506.8 million

Venom: Let There Be Carnage is a 2021 American superhero film based on the Marvel Comics character Venom. The sequel to Venom (2018) and the second film in Sony's Spider-Man Universe (SSU), it was directed by Andy Serkis from a screenplay by Kelly Marcel. Tom Hardy stars as Eddie Brock and Venom alongside Michelle Williams, Naomie Harris, Reid Scott, Stephen Graham, and Woody Harrelson. In the film, Eddie and the alien symbiote Venom must face serial killer Cletus Kasady (Harrelson) after he becomes the host of an offshoot of Venom named Carnage.

Venom was intended by Sony Pictures to be the start of a new shared universe, and plans for a sequel began during production on the first film. Harrelson was cast to make a brief appearance as Cletus at the end of Venom, with the intention of him becoming the villain Carnage in the sequel. Official work on the sequel began in January 2019, with Hardy and Harrelson confirmed to return along with Marcel as writer. Serkis was hired as director that August, partly due to his experience working with computer-generated imagery (CGI) and motion capture technology, which was an important part of portraying Venom and Carnage in the film. Filming took place at Leavesden Studios in England from November 2019 to February 2020, with additional filming in San Francisco in February. The title was announced in April 2020. Marco Beltrami was hired to compose the film's score, replacing Ludwig Göransson from the previous film.

Venom: Let There Be Carnage premiered in London on September 14, 2021, and was theatrically released in the United States on October 1, after multiple delays from an initial October 2020 date due to the COVID-19 pandemic. The film received mixed reviews from critics but was a box office success, grossing $506 million worldwide and becoming the seventh-highest-grossing film of 2021. A sequel, Venom: The Last Dance, was released on October 25, 2024.

== Plot ==
In 1996, young Cletus Kasady's lover, Frances Barrison, is taken away from St. Estes Home for Unwanted Children to the Ravencroft Institute. On the way, Frances uses her sonic scream powers to attack young police officer Patrick Mulligan. Mulligan shoots her in the eye and suffers an injury to his ear due to her scream. Mulligan believes he killed her, but Frances survives and her abilities are restricted at Ravencroft.

In present day, Mulligan, now a detective, asks journalist Eddie Brock to speak to serial killer Cletus in San Quentin State Prison, as Cletus refuses to talk to anyone other than Eddie. After the visit, Eddie's alien symbiote Venom deduces where Cletus has hidden the bodies of his victims, which gives Eddie a considerable career boost. Trying to lay low from police attention, Eddie bans Venom from devouring criminals, which upsets Venom. Cletus, who has been found guilty of his crimes thanks to Eddie, and sentenced to death by lethal injection, invites Eddie to his execution. There, Cletus insults Eddie, provoking Venom to attack. This lets Cletus bite Eddie's hand, inadvertently ingesting a part of the symbiote. The event causes a bad argument between Venom and Eddie back home, as Venom wants more freedom and Eddie wants peace. The symbiote decides to leave Eddie's body and go off on its own.

As Cletus's execution begins, a red symbiote emerges and blocks the injection. Named Carnage, it goes on a violent rampage through the prison, freeing inmates and killing guards. Carnage agrees to help Cletus break Frances out of Ravencroft in exchange for Cletus's help killing Eddie and Venom. Cletus frees Frances, and they travel to the St. Estes children's home to burn it down. Mulligan grows suspicious of Eddie and arrests him. Eddie contacts his ex-fiancée Anne Weying as his lawyer and asks her to find Venom. As Venom makes his way through San Francisco, hopping from body to body, Anne finds him bonded to Mrs. Chen and convinces him to forgive Eddie. Venom bonds with Anne, who reunites him with Eddie after Eddie apologizes to Venom. The pair escapes custody as Cletus and Frances take Mulligan and Anne hostage. The couple holds them at Grace Cathedral while they get married.

Eddie and Venom arrive to fight Carnage. Venom is overpowered but provokes Frances into using her powers to separate Carnage and Cletus, after which he devours both. The collapsing cathedral crushes Frances. Mulligan, having survived Frances' murder attempt, becomes infected by a piece of Carnage. Eddie and Venom, now fugitives, take the beach vacation Venom always wanted while they ponder their next steps.

In a mid-credits scene, as Venom tells Eddie about the symbiotes' knowledge of other universes, a blinding light suddenly transports them from their hotel room to another, where they watch J. Jonah Jameson talking about Spider-Man's revealed identity as Peter Parker on television. (Note: Eddie and Venom are transported to the Marvel Cinematic Universe (MCU) as a result of Doctor Strange's spell in Spider-Man: No Way Home (2021).)

== Cast ==
- Tom Hardy as Eddie Brock / Venom:
  An investigative journalist who is the host of an alien symbiote, Venom, that imbues him with superhuman abilities. Director Andy Serkis described Eddie and Venom's relationship as being in the "Odd Couple stage" in the film, with Venom trapped in Eddie's body and just wanting to be the "Lethal Protector" which distracts Eddie from work and putting his life back together.
- Michelle Williams as Anne Weying: A defense attorney and Eddie's ex-fiancée, who briefly hosts Venom.
- Naomie Harris as Frances Barrison / Shriek:
  Cletus's lover who can create sonic screams. Serkis described her as a damaged soul who has been living in isolation and has a dark side to her. Olumide Olorunfemi portrays a young Frances.
- Reid Scott as Dan Lewis: A doctor and Anne's fiancé.
- Stephen Graham as Patrick Mulligan: A detective hoping to use Eddie to find the remains of Cletus's murder victims. Sean Delaney portrays a young Mulligan.
- Woody Harrelson as Cletus Kasady / Carnage:
  A psychotic serial killer who becomes the host of Venom's spawn, Carnage. While in prison, Cletus refuses to talk with anyone besides Eddie, who he considers to be a kindred spirit. Cletus looks different compared to his appearance in the mid-credits scene of Venom, which Serkis said indicates the passage of time between films; the character's hair was changed for the sequel so it would not be distracting to the audience, coupled with Harrelson's dislike for the earlier hairstyle and preference for a more realistic one. Harrelson was initially reluctant to provide the voice for Carnage and wanted Serkis to perform it instead, but Serkis encouraged him to find the right tone for the character. Jack Bandeira portrays a young Cletus.

Additionally, Peggy Lu reprises her role from the first film as convenience store owner Mrs. Chen, who briefly hosts Venom, Sian Webber portrays Ravencroft doctor Camille Pazzo, Larry Olubamiwo appears as a Ravencroft guard, and Little Simz appears as herself. Footage of Tom Holland as Peter Parker / Spider-Man and J. K. Simmons as J. Jonah Jameson from the Marvel Cinematic Universe (MCU) appears in the mid-credits scene, with both actors uncredited.

== Production ==
=== Development ===
During the long development of the 2018 film Venom, the character Carnage was expected to appear as an antagonist. During pre-production on that film, the creative team decided not to include the character so they could focus on introducing the protagonists, Eddie Brock and Venom. Director Ruben Fleischer felt that leaving Venom's most formidable villain for a sequel would give the franchise a place to go and would be a natural next step, so Carnage's alter ego, Cletus Kasady, was introduced in a mid-credits scene at the end of the first film with the intention of featuring him in a sequel. Fleischer wanted to cast Woody Harrelson in the role, feeling there was a natural connection between the character and Harrelson's performance in Natural Born Killers (1994), and asked Harrelson while the pair were discussing a sequel to their film Zombieland (2009). After meeting with Fleischer and Tom Hardy—who portrays Eddie and Venom—for dinner, Harrelson agreed to take on the part. Harrelson described his decision as a roll of the dice since he was unable to read a script for the sequel before signing on to the first film. In August 2018, ahead of Venom's release, Hardy confirmed that he had signed on to star in two sequels. At the end of November 2018, Sony gave an October 2, 2020, release date to an untitled Marvel sequel that was believed to be Venom 2, which would place the film in the same release timeframe as the first Venom; box office analysts believed Venom had been successful enough to guarantee a sequel would be made.

Venom writer Jeff Pinkner confirmed in December 2018 that a sequel was happening, but he was not involved in writing it. Fleischer reiterated this, saying that he could not discuss a sequel but he saw the first film as Eddie and Venom "coming together. So there's a natural evolution from that to [a sequel where it is] like, okay, now what's it like to live together? It's like a bromantic sort of relationship." In January, Kelly Marcel signed a "significant" deal with Sony to write and produce the sequel after also working on the first film's script. This marked the official beginning of work on the film for the studio, and was revealed alongside confirmation of Avi Arad, Matt Tolmach, and Amy Pascal returning as producers. Hardy and Harrelson were also expected to return for the sequel, along with Michelle Williams in the role of Eddie's ex-fiancée Anne Weying. No director was confirmed, with Sony considering replacing Fleischer due to his commitments to Zombieland: Double Tap (2019), though he still intended to be involved in Venom 2. By the end of July 2019, Sony hoped for filming to begin that November and had met with several candidates to replace Fleischer as director since he was still completing work on Double Tap; directors the studio met with include Andy Serkis, Travis Knight, and Rupert Wyatt. Sony was also interested in Rupert Sanders directing the film, but that "didn't work out". Serkis confirmed at the start of August that he had discussed the project with Sony and it was "potentially something that might happen".

Serkis was officially hired to direct the film in early August 2019, partly due to his experience working with CGI and motion-capture technology as both an actor and director. Soon after his hiring, Serkis said Hardy had been working closely with Marcel on the screenplay which was "centered around their take"; Marcel explained that she and Hardy spent months developing ideas for the film, which is the first time he received a story credit on a project, before she then spent three months writing the screenplay herself. Fleischer said he was happy to let Serkis take over the franchise following the negative critical reaction that the first film received, believing reviewers had unfairly treated the "crowdpleasing movie", potentially due to biases against Sony and towards Marvel Studios' rival superhero films. By the time Serkis was hired, Hutch Parker had joined the sequel as a producer. A friend of Sony Pictures chairman Tom Rothman, Parker previously served as a producer for several Marvel-based films produced by 20th Century Fox.

=== Pre-production ===
In September 2019, Reid Scott was expected to reprise his role as Anne's boyfriend Dan Lewis from the first film. The character Shriek was also expected to appear as the film's secondary villain and a love interest for Carnage. Many different actresses were looked at for the part, before Naomie Harris was cast in the role in mid-October. Stephen Graham had also joined the film, as Detective Mulligan, by the end of the year. Tolmach said there was a chance the sequel could be rated R following the success of the R-rated Joker (2019), as well as previous successful R-rated comic book films such as Deadpool (2016) and Logan (2017). However, Tolmach cautioned that the PG-13 rating of the first Venom had led to box office success and they would not be looking to change the franchise's tone simply because it had worked for others; the sequel ultimately received a PG-13 rating. Tolmach said the biggest lesson learned from the first Venom was that fans loved the relationship between Eddie and Venom, and the sequel would focus more on the two characters together because of this. Serkis described the relationship as the "central love affair" of the film, and explained that the sequence in the film where Venom goes to a rave and talks about the "cruel treatment of aliens" uses imagery reminiscent of LGBTQIA festivals because the sequence is intended to be Venom's "coming-out party". Chinese production company Tencent Pictures co-financed the sequel after previously doing the same for the first film.

=== Filming ===
Principal photography began on November 15, 2019, at Leavesden Studios in Hertfordshire, England, under the working title Fillmore. Robert Richardson served as cinematographer for the film, reuniting with Serkis after they worked together on Breathe (2017). Filming took place at the campus of London South Bank University in mid-January 2020. Hardy revealed that filming in England was completed on February 8, with the production then moving to San Francisco where the film is set. Location filming continued in that city for several weeks, taking place in several neighborhoods including the Tenderloin, North Beach, Nob Hill, and Potrero Hill. In Potrero Hill, the Anchor Brewery stood in for a police station, while filming in Nob Hill took place at Grace Cathedral on February 20 and 21. Filming also took place at the Palace of Fine Arts in the Marina District. Some filming in San Francisco was impacted by production on The Matrix Resurrections (2021), with certain locations such as roads for driving scenes being unavailable to the Venom crew because that film was already using them. Helicopters that were being used to film Matrix sequences are visible in the background of a scene in the Venom sequel which uses dialogue to explain them as being police helicopters searching the city. Reshoots took place at Pinewood Studios.

=== Post-production ===
Post-production for the film began shortly before many film productions were forced to shut down due to the COVID-19 pandemic, with Serkis beginning work editing the film in London with the editorial department. Once post-production had to be shut down, the film's editor returned to the United States and began working with Serkis remotely to finish editing the film. The initial director's cut for the film was around 10 or 15 minutes longer than the final runtime, with Serkis wanting the film to be shorter than expected to make it a "real thrill ride" and to try get to Carnage's introduction with as little exposition as possible.

Sony confirmed in April that the film was scheduled to be released on October 2, 2020, and was intended to keep that release date despite the pandemic. Later that month, the studio moved the film's release to June 25, 2021, after that date became available due to other COVID-19 related delays. Sony also announced the film's title as Venom: Let There Be Carnage. An alternate title that was considered for the film was Venom: Love Will Tear Us Apart, which was named for the Joy Division song "Love Will Tear Us Apart". Serkis felt the delay in release would give more time to improve the film's visual effects, and would help ensure that audience members would be comfortable with going to see the film in theaters. The director was excited to adapt the comic book version of Carnage for the screen, and explained that the symbiotes were designed to reflect their hosts, so he differentiated Venom and Carnage by reflecting Eddie and Cletus, respectively, through their designs, abilities, and movements. Serkis worked with dancers and actors on a motion-capture stage to help define the movements of the two characters, and compared Venom to a quarterback who used brute force. For Carnage, Cletus's psychotic personality is shown through idiosyncratic and off-kilter movements, as well as being able to turn into mist and create "all manner of tendrils". Serkis compared fighting Carnage to fighting with an octopus. The film's mid-credits scene was directed by Spider-Man: No Way Home (2021) director Jon Watts during production of that film.

In March 2021, the film's release was moved back again to September 17, 2021, and then moved a week later to September 24. In August 2021, amidst SARS-CoV-2 Delta variant surges in the United States, the film was delayed again to October 15, 2021. By the end of the month, Sony was reportedly considering delaying the film to Morbius's release date of January 21, 2022, following continued Delta variant surges and low box office returns for films released earlier in August. Variety reported that the studio was not planning to move the film again at that time, but Deadline Hollywood described plans to change the film's release date as "the worst kept secret in Hollywood". Following the box office success of Shang-Chi and the Legend of the Ten Rings in early September, Sony moved the film's release date forward two weeks to October 1.

== Music ==
Marco Beltrami was revealed to be the composer for the film in December 2020, after previously composing for several Marvel-based films produced by Parker. In September 2021, Eminem was revealed to be composing a new song for the film after doing the same for the first Venom. Titled "Last One Standing", it was made in collaboration with Skylar Grey, Polo G, and Mozzy.

== Marketing ==
After announcing the film's official title in April 2020, Sony also released a short teaser featuring the official logo for the film. Many fans of the Venom comic books criticized the title, with some wondering why the comic book storyline title Maximum Carnage was not used. Sam Barsanti of The A.V. Club also thought Maximum Carnage would have worked better, or even Venom 2, and negatively compared the official title to films like Batman v Superman: Dawn of Justice (2016), The Assassination of Jesse James by the Coward Robert Ford (2007), and Legend of the Guardians: The Owls of Ga'Hoole (2010). /Film's Ethan Anderton acknowledged these criticisms, but felt it was a great title given the first film was "surprisingly goofy". Vinnie Mancuso at Collider agreed, calling it "the perfect title for a beautifully stupid franchise". He said it suggested Sony "knows the kind of property it has on its hands". Tom Reimann, also at Collider, described the teaser as Sony "proudly showing off the logo of the new film as if the title isn't completely insane".

In March 2021, Serkis said a trailer for the film had not yet been released due to the COVID-19 pandemic, with Sony waiting until audiences could see it in theaters. The film's first trailer was released in May, with Ryan Parker of The Hollywood Reporter describing it as intense but with some lighter moments. Parker highlighted Harrelson's improved wig compared to the first film, as did Collider's Rafael Motamayor, and Corey Chichizola at CinemaBlend. Chichizola praised Harrelson's presence in the trailer, and expressed excitement at the brief shots of Venom and Carnage, with Michael Kennedy of Screen Rant noting that the first trailer for Venom had received negative responses for not featuring Venom in it and this trailer avoided that problem by showing both of the sequel's symbiote characters. A second trailer was released in August, with Sam Barsanti of The A. V. Club highlighting the expanded footage of Carnage as well as the continued focus on Eddie and Venom's chemistry. Lauren Massuda at Collider concurred with Barsanti on both points, and felt Harrelson had "taken the spotlight" of the second trailer. Massuda felt the sequel appeared more intriguing and mature than the first film, while Screen Rant's James Hunt opined that the sequel "already looks much better" than the first film in terms of tone, character, and visual effects. In September, a character poster for Anne was alleged to have copied the silhouette of She-Venom from fan art published by DeviantArt artist spaceMAXmarine in October 2018. In December, to promote the digital and then-upcoming Blu-ray home media release of the film, a web series titled Chen's Market was released to Facebook and Instagram Live, starring Peggy Lu and Santana Maynard, the former reprising their roles from the film, alongside the voices of Hardy and Jon Bailey.

== Release ==
=== Theatrical ===
Venom: Let There Be Carnage was screened for fans in London on September 14, 2021, and was released in the United States on October 1 in RealD 3D and IMAX. In August 2021, Sony and CJ 4DPlex announced a deal to release 15 of Sony's films over three years in the ScreenX format, starting with Let There Be Carnage. The film was originally set for release in the U.S. on October 2, 2020. It was delayed several times to June 25, 2021, September 17, September 24, and then October 15, before being moved back up to October 1. These shifts were made in part due to the COVID-19 pandemic and to avoid opening against F9: The Fast Saga and Halloween Kills.

=== Home media ===
The film debuted atop the iTunes, Google Play, and Vudu charts following its release on PVOD services in late November 2021. In April 2021, Sony signed a deal giving Disney access to their legacy content, including Marvel content in Sony's Spider-Man Universe (SSU), to stream on Disney+ and Hulu and appear on Disney's linear television networks. Disney's access to Sony's titles would come following their availability on Netflix.

== Reception ==
=== Box office ===
Venom: Let There Be Carnage grossed $213.6 million in the United States and Canada, and $293.3 million in other territories, for a worldwide total of $506.9 million.

In the United States and Canada, the film was released alongside The Many Saints of Newark and The Addams Family 2, with Sony estimating a $40 million debut and box office analysts predicted it could reach as much as $65 million in its opening weekend. The film grossed $37.3 million on its first day, which included $11.6 million from Thursday night previews, besting the $10 million made by the first Venom and marking the second-biggest total since the start of the COVID-19 pandemic, behind Black Widow's $13.2 million. In its opening weekend, Let There Be Carnage debuted to $90.1 million, marking the highest-grossing opening of the pandemic to that point, and surpassing the opening weekend gross of Venom ($80.3 million). The film declined 64% in its second weekend with $32 million, finishing second behind newcomer No Time to Die. During the weekend ending November 14, Let There Be Carnage became the second film to cross the $200 million mark at the United States and Canadian box-office during the pandemic, following Shang-Chi and the Legend of the Ten Rings. It ended its box office run as the third-highest-grossing film of 2021 in this region.

=== Critical response ===
The film received mixed reviews from critics, most of whom praised the performances of Hardy and Harrelson, chemistry between Eddie and Venom, and the mid-credits scene, but criticized the screenplay. The review aggregation website Rotten Tomatoes reports an approval rating of 58% based on 283 reviews, with an average rating of 5.4/10. The website's critical consensus reads, "A sequel aimed squarely at fans of the original's odd couple chemistry, Venom: Let There Be Carnage eagerly embraces the franchise's sillier side." Metacritic assigned the film a weighted average score of 49 out of 100, based on 48 critics, indicating "mixed or average reviews". Audiences polled by CinemaScore gave the film an average grade of "B+" on an A+ to F scale, the same as the first film, while those at PostTrak gave it a 76% positive score, with 65% saying they would definitely recommend it.

Writing for RogerEbert.com, Christy Lemire gave the film 3 out of 4 stars and praised Hardy's "gung-ho physical performance". Kristen Page-Kirby of The Washington Post praised the film, commenting, "It's fast, it's fun, and buried within is a genuinely sweet story about friendship and self-acceptance." Tim Grierson of Screen International said that Serkis's direction "keeps the rambunctious proceedings relatively taut, making room for operatic action and a sneaky emotional undercurrent that pokes through the broad comedy and comic-book grandeur." James Mottram of the South China Morning Post gave the film a score of 4/5 stars, writing that the film "is simplified, more focused and even more intimate than its predecessor—employing only a handful of characters and a remarkably stripped down narrative." Clarisse Loughrey of The Independent also gave the film a score of 4/5 stars, describing it as "a love story written in blood, sweat and the slime of half-eaten brains." Tim Robey of The Daily Telegraph gave the film a score of 3/5 stars, writing: "Venom: Let There Be Carnage is refreshingly nuts, and benefits from being a whole 45 minutes shorter than its predecessor." Joe Morgenstern of The Wall Street Journal wrote that the film "manipulates its audience with all the tentacles it can deploy, most of them cheerfully ridiculous."

Richard Roeper of the Chicago Sun-Times gave the film a mixed review, giving it a score of 2/4 stars. He described the film as being "marginally better than the original, with a firmer commitment to the comedic angle and Tom Hardy clearly having a lot of fun", but added: "this vehicle runs out of gas halfway through the yawner of a climax." John DeFore of The Hollywood Reporter wrote: "The film does develop the chemistry between the titular alien and the human he's forced to inhabit while inside Earth's atmosphere. But the distinctiveness of this buddy-movie bond is often drowned out by giant set pieces of CG mayhem that feel exactly like those found in the good guys' movies." Brian Lowry of CNN was more critical of his review for the film and described the film as "a mind-numbingly tiresome sequel, filled with uninspired comedy and a CGI monster fight that seems to drag on forever." David Sims of The Atlantic described the viewing experience as being "like going to a nightclub and having someone scream the plot in your ear over a thumping bass line". Kevin Maher of The Times gave the film a score of 1/5 stars, describing it as an "abominable sequel".

William Hughes at The A.V. Club believed the mid-credits scene would overshadow the rest of the film, saying, "In the span of about 120 seconds, the most externally interesting thing about Sony's latest big superhero blockbuster... [is] its connection to a whole other studio's library of films". He continued that the two Venom films were "at least genuinely interesting and weird ... propelled by a devotedly odd performance" from Hardy, but ultimately felt Let There Be Carnage would become "little more than 'the one where Venom gets pulled into the MCU'". Barry Hertz of The Globe and Mail praised the film's mid-credits scene but described the rest of the film as "ugly, cheap and dumb-but-not-good-dumb" and "a throwaway kind of trashy nothingness".

=== Accolades ===
Accolades received by House of Gucci
Award	Date of ceremony	Category	Recipient(s)	Result	Ref.
People's Choice Awards	December 7, 2021	The Movie of 2021	Venom: Let There Be Carnage	Nominated	
People's Choice Awards	December 7, 2021	The Action Movie of 2021	Venom: Let There Be Carnage	Nominated	
Hawaii Film Critics Society	January 14, 2022	Worst Film of 2021	Venom: Let There Be Carnage	Nominated	
Visual Effects Society Awards	March 8, 2022	Outstanding Animated Character in a Photoreal Feature	Richard Spriggs, Ricardo Silva, Lucas Cuenca, Federico Frassinelli (for Carnage)	Nominated	
Artios Awards	March 23, 2022	The Zeitgeist Award	Lucy Bevan, Nina Henninger (Location Casting), Emily Brockmann (Associate), Sarah Kliban (Associate)	Nominated	

== Sequel ==
In December 2021, Pascal said they were in the "planning stages" of Venom 3. Sony confirmed the film was in development at CinemaCon in April 2022. In June, Hardy revealed that Marcel was writing the script after previously working on the prior Venom films, and that he was co-writing the story with her. That October, Marcel was set to make her directorial debut with the film and to also produce it. Venom: The Last Dance was released on October 25, 2024.

== See also ==
- List of Marvel Cinematic Universe films
