= The Black Ice =

1993 book by Michael Connelly

- Hardcover edition
- Author: Michael Connelly
- Language: English
- Series: Harry Bosch
- Release number: 2
- Genre: Crime, mystery, thriller
- Publisher: Little, Brown and Company
- Publication date: June 1, 1993
- Publication place: United States
- Media type: Print (hardcover, paperback)
- Pages: 336 pp.
- ISBN: 0-316-15382-6
- Preceded by: The Black Echo
- Followed by: The Concrete Blonde

The Black Ice is a crime thriller novel, and the second novel by American author Michael Connelly, featuring Los Angeles Police Department detective Hieronymus "Harry" Bosch. It is the second book in the Harry Bosch series, preceded by The Black Echo and followed by The Concrete Blonde.

The Black Ice was released by Little, Brown and Company on June 1, 1993.

== Plot ==
On Christmas night, a body is found in a motel. Uncalled, Harry Bosch investigates anyway. The deceased is likely Calexico Moore, a missing Los Angeles Police Department cop. Harry notifies the widow and feels drawn to her. This attraction, plus feeling bypassed, sparks his interest. When a personal murder case appears related, he follows evidence where superiors forbid.

Harry spends Christmas alone, listening to the police radio. Hearing a call about a dead body, he realizes he was bypassed. Learning the Robbery-Homicide Division took over, Harry visits the motel and finds a suicide layout without a note. The deputy chief orders him away, but Harry secretly reads a newly found typed note.

Harry informs Sylvia, Moore's estranged wife, admiring her strength. He learns Moore faced internal scrutiny regarding a letter Sylvia denies writing. Ordered away, Harry receives old cases to clear. One current case, the unsolved beating of a Juan Doe, points to Moore. Soon, Moore's colleagues give Harry a file left in a squad car meant for him.

The file contains Moore's findings on Black Ice, a Hawaiian drug sold by Mexicans. This matches Harry's questions about a dead Hawaiian dealer whom Moore met recently. The file mentions an arrest caused by a tip from Harry's victim, meaning the murder was a response. Mexicans and Hawaiians are fighting for market control.

Teresa Corazon, Harry's lover, shares the Juan Doe autopsy report. Fruit flies on the body show he labored where insects are dyed and irradiated. Teresa admits Moore was murdered due to a head wound, but her boss resists calling it a homicide. She asks Harry to keep it quiet, but he leaks the news.

Harry tracks the fruit fly industry, learning containers enter from Mexico unsearched. He suspects a major drug operation run by a Mexicali drug lord. Juan Doe matches a missing Mexican laborer. Harry visits Mexicali, after carefully checking childhood photos at Moore's apartment.

In Mexicali, a local cop helps Harry identify the laborer. Harry searches the home, finding paystubs from EnviroBreed, the fly company. Surviving a hotel shooting, Harry breaks into the business. He finds a secret passageway running to Zorrillo's ranch across the street.

Recognizing Zorrillo from photos, Harry realizes they are half-brothers. During a raid, Harry enters the passageway. The boot prints prove Zorrillo is dead but Moore lives. Harry finds Moore at his father's house. Moore asked Zorrillo for money to buy his childhood home, offering protection in exchange. Unhappy, Moore killed Zorrillo to fake his own death. Moore draws a weapon, forcing Harry to shoot. Harry hides the body, ensuring the widow receives her pension.

== Potential film adaptation ==
In the early 1990s, Mace Neufeld, a producer for Paramount Pictures, acquired the film rights for the novel. Neufeld hired screenwriter Scott Rosenberg to write the script, with John Travolta being looked at for the lead role. Several directors were considered; options included Oliver Stone, John Frankenheimer, Steven Soderbergh, and Paul Verhoeven.
