= Kelly Marcel =

English screenwriter (born 1974)

- Born: 10 January 1974 (age 52); London, England
- Education: University of Exeter
- Occupations: Screenwriter; director; producer; actress
- Years active: 1989–present
- Father: Terry Marcel
- Relatives: Rosie Marcel (sister)

Kelly Marcel (born 10 January 1974) is an English filmmaker and former actress.

After working as a child actor in the United Kingdom, Marcel had her breakout as a screenwriter in Hollywood when her script for Saving Mr. Banks made the 2011 Black List and was quickly acquired by Disney, which released the film in 2013. She is also known for writing the 2015 film adaptation of E. L. James' Fifty Shades of Grey and the Sony's Spider-Man Universe film Venom (2018) as well as its sequels Venom: Let There Be Carnage (2021) and Venom: The Last Dance (2024), the latter of which was her directorial debut.

Marcel also created and served as executive producer of the television series Terra Nova (2011) and The Changeling (2023), for which she was also the showrunner and is credited with writing eight episodes.

== Early life ==
Marcel was born in London, England, and studied English literature at the University of Exeter. Her father is filmmaker Terry Marcel, and she has a sister, actress Rosie Marcel.

== Career ==
=== Child acting career (1989–2003) ===
Marcel worked as a child actor in the United Kingdom, playing minor roles in television series such as The Bill, Holby City, and Casualty. She also had a largely non-speaking role as Young Vera in the 1994 television film adaptation of A Dark-Adapted Eye.

=== Early work as screenwriter (2008–2011) ===
Marcel eventually quit acting to pursue writing while working part-time in Prime Time Video, a video rental shop in Battersea, London. Around the corner from the video shop was the Latchmere pub, where Tom Hardy hosted an acting workshop. Marcel and Hardy became friends, and he subsequently brought Marcel in to do uncredited rewrites on his 2008 film Bronson, directed by Nicolas Winding Refn, after it ran into trouble. One of Hardy's tattoos says 'Skribe' in tribute to Marcel.

While working at the video shop, she wrote a script for a TV show called Gondwanaland Highway. She wrote it for her father, who had been telling her about the supercontinent Gondwanaland and reading a Stephen Hawking book on time travel. Marcel, who had just seen Al Gore's 2006 global warming documentary An Inconvenient Truth, combined these three influences into the script. Gondwanaland Highway was almost picked up by Carnival Films, the UK production company behind Downton Abbey, when producer Aaron Kaplan persuaded Marcel to bring the show to America instead—where it became the tv series Terra Nova.

She sold a script about death row, titled Westbridge, to Showtime. She worked on the script with director Thomas Schlamme. Though the script went unmade, it became a calling card for Marcel in Hollywood.

=== Hollywood breakthrough (2011–2013) ===
After her two-week trip to Los Angeles and her decision not to continue working on Terra Nova, Marcel returned to the London video shop. She was approached by Ruby Films' Alison Owen to work on a project about Mary Poppins author P. L. Travers and her relationship with Walt Disney for BBC Films, based on an earlier draft by Sue Smith. The script, Saving Mr. Banks, landed on the 2011 Black List, and was acquired by Disney.

The film was released in 2013, directed by John Lee Hancock, and starring Tom Hanks as Walt Disney and Emma Thompson as P. L. Travers. Marcel and Smith shared writing credit. Marcel was nominated for Outstanding Debut by a British Writer, Director or Producer at the 67th Annual BAFTA Awards.

=== Box office success as screenwriter (2014–2021) ===
Marcel was hired in 2012 to adapt E. L. James' bestselling erotic novel Fifty Shades of Grey, with Sam Taylor-Johnson directing, after Universal Pictures and Focus Features won the rights to the Fifty Shades trilogy for $5 million in a bidding war. Though the film was financially successful, grossing $571.1 million worldwide on a $40 million budget and spawning two sequels, both Marcel and Johnson expressed unhappiness with the finished film, with Marcel describing it as too painful to watch. Of particular issue was James' insistence that the film preserve her original dialogue in its entirety, and threatening to boycott the film if the dialogue was rewritten.

She was one of the writers on Sony's Venom adaptation, alongside Scott Rosenberg and Jeff Pinkner. Directed by Ruben Fleischer, the film stars Marcel's friend and frequent collaborator Tom Hardy in the title role. She returned to write the scripts for Venom's first and second sequels, Venom: Let There Be Carnage (2021) and Venom: The Last Dance (2024), receiving sole writing credit on both films. The first three Venom films were both big successes at the box office and have been by far the most financially successful of all the live-action films in the Sony's Spider-Man Universe (SSU).

=== Success as TV and film writer, creator, showrunner, and director (2022–present) ===
In October 2022, it was announced that Marcel would be making her directorial debut in 2024 with Venom: The Last Dance, in addition to writing and producing the film. The Last Dance marks the third movie in Sony's Venom trilogy, all of which have been written or co-written by Marcel.

In September 2023, The Changeling premiered on Apple TV+ with Marcel at the show's helm as its creator, showrunner, and the credited writer for all eight episodes in the first season. Marcel worked in close, intense collaboration with author Victor LaValle in adapting his award-winning 2017 novel The Changeling into a television show with the same name for Apple TV+ that premiered in October 2023. When asked about this project, Marcel stated "I think part of being faithful to a novel whilst also expanding it for TV is finding a miraculous partner like Victor [LaValle], who will come along on the journey with you,” adding that LaValle was on-set every day and encouraged her to experiment with his story. LaValle echoed similar comments about his admiration for Marcel: "The best kind of leader says, 'All of you have power and you come to me and I will take every good thing, every good idea you have, and run with it. And Kelly was such a model of that kind of confidence. I felt very honored." The show was well received by critics, with Allison Picurro of TV Guide writing that "Anyone willing to go along for the ride is in for an enchanting storybook of a series, one of the year's most singular offerings."

== Filmography ==
=== Film ===
Year	Title	Director	Writer	Producer
2013	Saving Mr. Banks	No	Yes	No
2015	Fifty Shades of Grey	No	Yes	No
2018	Venom	No	Yes	Executive
2021	Cruella	No	Story	No
2021	Venom: Let There Be Carnage	No	Yes	Yes
2024	Venom: The Last Dance	Yes	Yes	Yes
2026	Practical Magic 2	No	Yes	Executive
2026	The Cat in the Hat	No	No	Executive

=== Other roles ===
Year	Title	Role
1977	Prey	Child (uncredited)
1989	Great Balls of Fire!	Teenage Girl #2
1991	Turbulence	Ruth
1994	Mainline Run	Sarah
2000	Strong Language	Phillipa
2008	Bronson	Script editor, reported to have done an emergency final rewrite of script (uncredited)
2010	The Heavy	Script editor
2015	Mad Max: Fury Road	Uncredited script work, thanked in credits

=== Television ===
Year	Title	Writer	Executive producer	Creator	Notes
2011	Terra Nova	Yes	Yes	Yes	Wrote episode "Genesis: Part 1"
2023	The Changeling	Yes	Yes	Yes	Showrunner, wrote 8 episodes

=== Acting roles ===
Year	Title	Role	Notes
1989–2005	The Bill	Various	5 episodes
1992	Casualty	Vicky Morris	Episode "Rates of Exchange"
1993	What You Lookin' At?	Elaine	
1993	Woof!	Miranda	Episode "Miranda"
1994	The Barbara Vine Mysteries	Young Vera	Series 3 ("A Dark-Adapted Eye")
1994	Love Hurts	Louise	Episode "Blue Heaven"
1994	Wild Justice	Melissa Stride	TV movie
1997	Dangerfield	Elaine Foster	Episode "Adam"
2003	Holby City	Rachel Hughes	Episode "Endgame"
