= Venom: The Last Dance =

2024 film by Kelly Marcel

- Theatrical release poster
- Directed by: Kelly Marcel
- Screenplay by: Kelly Marcel
- Story by: Tom Hardy; Kelly Marcel
- Based on: Marvel Comics
- Produced by: Avi Arad; Matt Tolmach; Amy Pascal; Kelly Marcel; Tom Hardy; Hutch Parker
- Starring: Tom Hardy; Chiwetel Ejiofor; Juno Temple; Rhys Ifans; Stephen Graham; Peggy Lu; Alanna Ubach
- Cinematography: Fabian Wagner
- Edited by: Mark Sanger
- Music by: Dan Deacon
- Production companies: Columbia Pictures; Marvel Entertainment; Arad Productions; Matt Tolmach Productions; Pascal Pictures; Marcel Hardy Productions; Hutch Parker Entertainment
- Distributed by: Sony Pictures Releasing
- Release dates: October 21, 2024 (New York City); October 25, 2024 (United States)
- Running time: 109 minutes
- Country: United States
- Language: English
- Budget: $110–120 million
- Box office: $478.9 million

Venom: The Last Dance is a 2024 American superhero film based on the Marvel Comics character Venom. It is the sequel to Venom (2018) and Venom: Let There Be Carnage (2021), and the fifth film in Sony's Spider-Man Universe (SSU). Written and directed by Kelly Marcel in her directional debut, it stars Tom Hardy as Eddie Brock and Venom, alongside Chiwetel Ejiofor, Juno Temple, Rhys Ifans, Stephen Graham, Peggy Lu, and Alanna Ubach. In the film, Eddie and Venom are on the run from both of their worlds.

Tom Hardy revealed in August 2018 that he was signed on to appear in a third Venom film and Sony Pictures began development by December 2021 after the second film was released. Marcel and Hardy were writing the script by June 2022, and Marcel was set to make her directorial debut with the film that October. New cast members, including Ejiofor and Temple, joined in mid-2023 and filming began at the end of June 2023 in Spain. Production was halted the next month due to the 2023 SAG-AFTRA strike, and resumed that November after the strike ended. The film was completed by the end of February 2024.

Venom: The Last Dance premiered at the Regal Times Square theater in New York City on October 21, 2024, and was released in the United States on October 25. The film received mixed reviews from critics, with some praising Hardy's performance. Despite being the lowest-grossing film in the trilogy, it was still a box-office success, grossing $478.9 million worldwide.

== Plot ==
After returning from another universe, (Note: Identified offscreen as the Marvel Cinematic Universe) Eddie Brock and the Venom symbiote are drunk in a bar in Mexico. Still on the run after their recent battle with Carnage, (Note: As depicted in Venom: Let There Be Carnage (2021)) the apparent murder of Patrick Mulligan makes international headlines with Eddie, who is falsely branded a prime suspect. He decides to set out for New York City to meet an old acquaintance in an attempt to clear his name — not before unwittingly leaving a bit of Venom at the bar. Meanwhile, a creature known as a Xenophage has begun tracking Eddie and Venom.

Soldier Rex Strickland oversees Imperium, a government operation at the site of the soon-to-be-decommissioned Area 51 for the capture and study of other symbiotes that have fallen to Earth. Mulligan, revealed to have survived his encounter with Carnage, is captured by Strickland. He is bonded with one of many contained symbiotes and questioned by Imperium researchers Dr. Teddy Paine and Sadie "Christmas" to learn about the symbiotes' purpose on Earth.

While traveling via the side of an airplane bound for New York City, Eddie and Venom are attacked by the Xenophage and forced to drop into the Nevada desert. Venom explains that Xenophages were sent to Earth by symbiote creator Knull to retrieve a Codex, forged when a symbiote resurrects its host; the Codex will free Knull from the prison the symbiotes trapped him in long ago. Having previously revived Eddie, (Note: As depicted in Venom (2018)) Venom and Eddie are now carrying a Codex. After escaping both the Xenophage and Strickland and his team, Eddie hitches a ride to Las Vegas with a family of alien enthusiast hippies. Mulligan's symbiote informs Strickland of Knull's intentions with the Codex, which can only be destroyed if either Eddie or Venom dies.

In Las Vegas, after a reunion with Mrs. Chen, Eddie and Venom are ambushed by both the Xenophage and Strickland's team. The pair are separated and taken to Area 51. Sadie, sympathetic to the symbiotes, frees Venom, who re-bonds with Eddie after Strickland shoots him. This attracts the Xenophage, which devours Mulligan in the battle. Venom has the other confined symbiotes released, which bond with Sadie and the other scientists to fight off the Xenophage. Knull is signalled that the Codex has been found and sends more Xenophages to Earth, overwhelming the symbiotes. Realizing he must sacrifice himself to destroy the Codex and save the universe, Venom merges with the Xenophages, leads them to the acid tanks, and bids Eddie farewell. A mortally wounded Strickland has a change of heart about the symbiotes and sets off his grenades to destroy the Xenophages. Teddy bonds with a symbiote to save Sadie from the resulting explosion.

Eddie wakes up in a hospital, where a military official informs him that his brave actions at Area 51 have earned him an expungement, under the condition of keeping the events a secret. Eddie travels to New York City and visits the Statue of Liberty to honor Venom, who had desired to see the statue. In a mid-credits scene, Knull declares that the universe is no longer safe from him now that Venom has fallen. In a post-credits scene, the Mexican bartender—who was taken into custody by Strickland after Eddie left—escapes the burned remains of Area 51. Nearby, a black cockroach crawls out next to a broken vial that previously contained a sample of the Venom symbiote.

== Cast ==
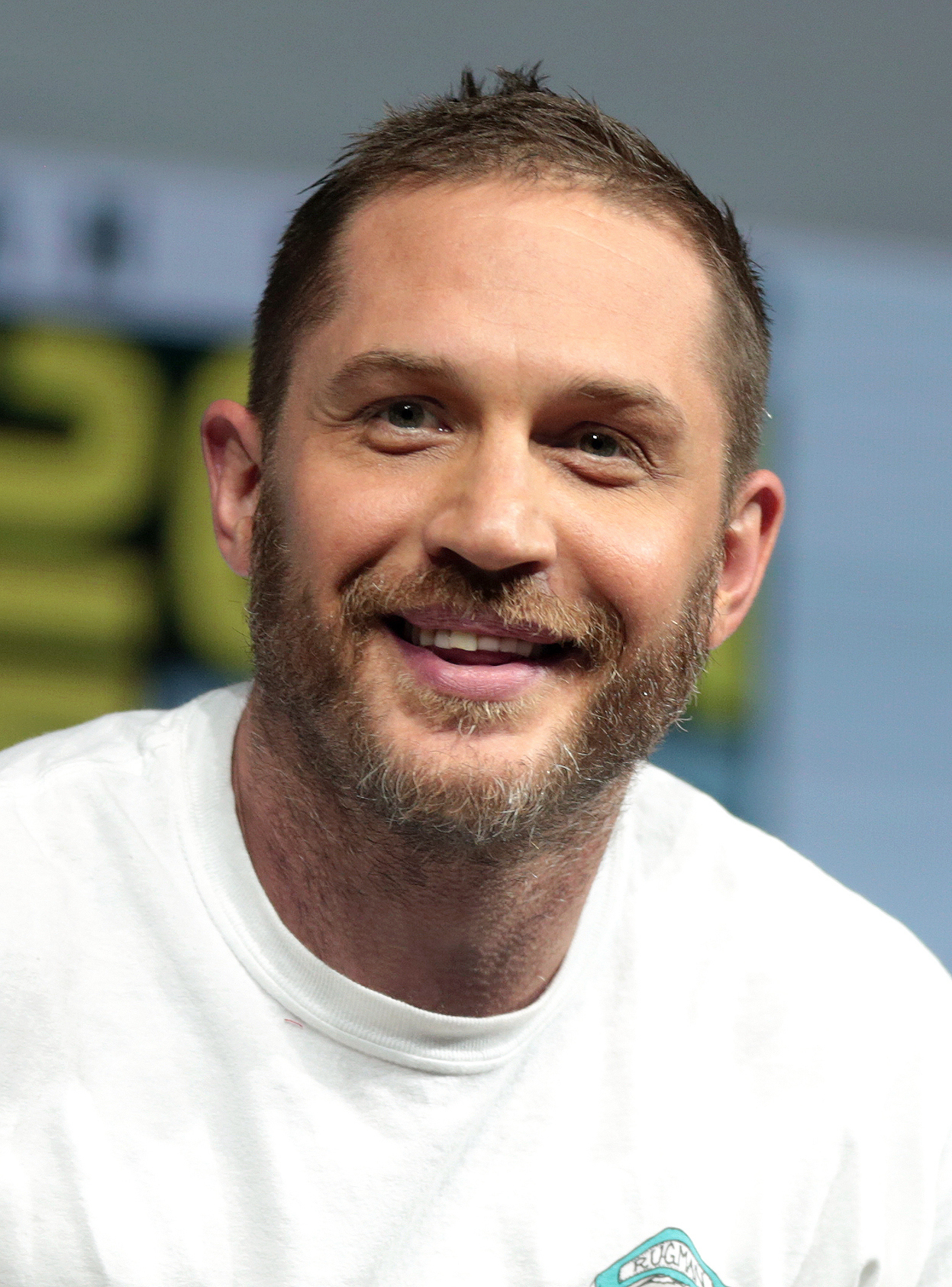
Tom Hardy reprises his role as Eddie Brock and Venom.

- Tom Hardy as Eddie Brock / Venom: An investigative journalist who is the host of Venom, an alien symbiote that imbues him with super-human abilities.
- Chiwetel Ejiofor as General Rex Strickland: A commander for Imperium who is tracking Eddie and trying to capture Venom.
- Juno Temple as Dr. Theodora "Teddy" Paine: A scientist for Imperium, haunted by the death of her brother from a lightning strike that also paralyzed her left arm.
- Rhys Ifans as Martin Moon: A hippie and an alien enthusiast.
- Stephen Graham as Patrick Mulligan: A former police detective who was infected with a symbiote after encountering Carnage, but is left for dead by it before he is captured by Imperium. Graham also voices an unnamed green wisdom symbiote with whom Mulligan bonds. (Note: While neither symbiote is named on-screen, the official subtitles of the movie trailer call the green symbiote Toxin. The symbiote that saved Mulligan's life remains unidentified.)
- Peggy Lu as Mrs. Chen: A convenience store owner who befriended Eddie and Venom.
- Clark Backo as Sadie "Christmas": A researcher for Imperium. She is nicknamed "Christmas" by Strickland due to her Christmas tree badge.
- Alanna Ubach as Nova Moon: Martin's wife and fellow hippie.
- Andy Serkis as Knull: The creator of the symbiotes, who seeks Eddie and Venom's codex to free himself. Director Kelly Marcel said about choosing Serkis, who directed Venom: Let There Be Carnage (2021), to play the character: "We knew on Venom 2 that he was going to be this [Knull] character, we should be able to bring the character into this movie."

Additionally, Hala Finley and Dash McCloud portray Martin's children Echo and Leaf Moon, respectively. Cristo Fernández reprises his role as the bartender from the Marvel Cinematic Universe (MCU) film Spider-Man: No Way Home (2021), as well as a version of the character from Venom's universe. Jared Abrahamson portrays Captain Forrest, a member of Imperium. Jack Brady portrays Jim, an Imperium security guard who bonds with a brown-colored symbiote, while Jade Nicholson-Lamb portrays Jade Clark, an Imperium lab technician who bonds with a violet-colored symbiote. Reid Scott, who previously portrayed Dr. Dan Lewis in the first two Venom films, returns as the shadowy head of Imperium. (Note: The head of Imperium and Dan Lewis are separate characters, despite Reid Scott being credited as "Dr. Dan Lewis" in the film's end credits.)

== Production ==
=== Development and pre-production ===
Star Tom Hardy stated in August 2018 that he had signed on to star in three Venom films. In September 2021, Hardy noted that the producers would have to continue to develop Sony's Spider-Man Universe (SSU) in future films but said they were also interested in crossing over with the Marvel Cinematic Universe (MCU) more. Venom: Let There Be Carnage (2021) director Andy Serkis expressed interest in returning to direct another Venom film, and felt there was more to explore with Venom in future films before the character could meet Spider-Man in a future crossover film, including further exploration of the Ravencroft Institute and other potential villains being held there. In October, Tom Holland said he and producer Amy Pascal had discussed him potentially reprising his MCU role as Peter Parker / Spider-Man in future Venom sequels, after he made a cameo appearance in Let There Be Carnage via footage from the MCU film Spider-Man: No Way Home (2021). Neither Holland nor his character appeared in the finished film. Adam B. Vary clarified in December 2024 that, according to one Sony source, The Walt Disney Company never precluded Sony from using Holland for their films; it simply never happened due to the studio feeling that audiences wouldn't accept Holland's Spider-Man appearing in non-MCU films, especially after the releases of No Way Home and Doctor Strange in the Multiverse of Madness (2022) and the MCU's multiverse.

Sony Pictures confirmed the film was in development at CinemaCon in April 2022. In June, Hardy revealed that Kelly Marcel was writing the screenplay after previously working on the prior Venom films and that he was co-writing the story with her. Hardy was set to be paid $20 million for his involvement. Serkis was unable to return as director due to his commitments to Animal Farm, which he had delayed to work on Let There Be Carnage, but ultimately portrayed the character Knull in the film. Marcel signed on in October to make her directorial debut with the film, which was expected to conclude the Venom trilogy. She was also set to produce the film alongside Avi Arad, Matt Tolmach, Pascal, Hutch Parker, and Hardy, all doing so through their respective production companies Arad Productions, Matt Tolmach Productions, Pascal Pictures, Hutch Parker Entertainment, and Hardy Son & Baker. Columbia Pictures also produces in association with Marvel Entertainment. Hardy confirmed in February 2023 that pre-production work had begun. Juno Temple entered negotiations to join the cast in an undisclosed "lead role" in April. The next month, filming was expected to begin in June in London, and Chiwetel Ejiofor was cast as Rex Strickland, when Temple was confirmed to have been cast. In June, the film was set for release in October 2024.

The film features Knull, the King in Black of the symbiotes who was introduced to the source material in 2018. The filmmakers were always kept aware of the character, but decided they had to lay the foundations for Venom's character and his relationship with Eddie Brock before featuring the Marvel supervillain. As such, they looked for inspiration from the Venom comic books by David Michelinie, Todd McFarlane, Donny Cates and Ryan Stegman, the latter two being Knull's creators, leading Sony to hire them for an advisory relationship and allowing at least Cates to read the screenplay. Cates and Stegman expected monetary compensation for the inclusion of Knull.

=== Filming ===
Principal photography began on June 26, 2023, at Los Mateos in Cartagena, Spain, as well as at the Calblanque Regional Park, under the working title Orwell. Fabian Wagner serves as the cinematographer after previously serving as an additional cinematographer on Let There Be Carnage. The start of the 2023 SAG-AFTRA strike in mid-July 2023 resulted in filming being halted. Later that month, the film was set to release on July 12, 2024. When the actors' strike ended in early November 2023, Sony delayed the film to release on November 8, 2024, filling the November 2024 date that the studio had previously reserved for an untitled Marvel film. Production was preparing to resume at that time. Filming resumed on November 16. In February 2024, Clark Backo joined the cast in an undisclosed role, and Temple said at the end of the month that filming was nearly completed.

=== Post-production ===
In March 2024, the film was titled Venom: The Last Dance and its release date was moved forward to October 25, 2024. The first teaser trailer, released in June, confirmed Peggy Lu and Stephen Graham were reprising their respective roles as Mrs. Chen and Patrick Mulligan from prior Venom films, as well as the castings of Rhys Ifans, Alanna Ubach, and Cristo Fernández. Ifans previously portrayed Curt Connors / Lizard in Sony's The Amazing Spider-Man (2012) and No Way Home, while Fernández appeared in No Way Home as a bartender who interacts with Brock after he is transported to the MCU via the multiverse. Germain Lussier at io9 questioned if the appearances of Ifans and Ejiofor, who played Karl Mordo in the MCU, were less concerned about continuity with the MCU and were instead commentary on the multiverse, rather than being connected to their prior roles. Molly Edwards of Total Film was also confused by the reference to the mid-credits scene of No Way Home in the trailer, since the Venom films are set in a separate universe from the MCU. John Moffatt and Aharon Bourland serve as the visual effects supervisors while Greg Baxter is the visual effects producer. Visual effects are provided by Industrial Light & Magic (ILM), DNEG, Digital Domain, Rodeo FX, and Territory Studio, while the Third Floor, Inc., Torchlight, and Host provided the previsualization and postvisualization work. Mark Sanger edited the film, which was completed at the Cary Grant Theatre at the Sony Pictures Studios lot in early October 2024.

== Music ==
By August 2024, Dan Deacon composed the score for the film.

== Release ==
=== Theatrical ===
Venom: The Last Dance held its world premiere at the Regal Times Square theater in New York City on October 21, 2024, and was theatrically released by Sony Pictures Releasing in the United States on October 25, in IMAX and other premium large formats (PLFs). The film was originally expected to be released in October 2024 before it was given a release date of July 12, 2024, when Sony adjusted their release schedule due to the SAG-AFTRA strike. After the strike ended, the film's release was delayed to November 8, 2024, before it was moved forward and returned to the October 2024 timeframe.

=== Home media ===
The film was released on digital download on December 10, 2024, and it was released on DVD, Blu-ray and 4K UHD on January 21, 2025, by Sony Pictures Home Entertainment.

Sony signed deals with Netflix and Disney in April 2021 for the rights to their 2022 to 2026 film slate, following the films' theatrical and home media windows. Netflix signed for exclusive "pay 1 window" streaming rights, which is typically an 18-month window and included future Venom films following Venom: Let There Be Carnage. Disney signed for "pay 2 window" rights for the films, which would be streamed on Disney+ and Hulu as well as broadcast on Disney's linear television networks.

== Reception ==
=== Box office ===
Venom: The Last Dance grossed $139.8 million in the United States and Canada, and $339.2 million in other territories, for a worldwide total of $478.9 million.

In the United States and Canada, Venom: The Last Dance was released alongside Conclave, and was projected to gross around $65 million from 4,125 theaters in its opening weekend. The film made $22 million on its first day, including $8.5 million from Thursday night previews. It went onto debut to $51 million, finishing in first but marking the lowest opening of the series. Deadline Hollywood attributed the underperformance to the ongoing Yankees–Dodgers World Series and superhero genre fatigue. Nevertheless, the film's international box office gross would help offset its weaker performance at the North American box office. The film then made $26.1 million in its second weekend (dropping 49% from its first weekend), and $16.2 million in its third weekend (dropping another 37%), retaining the top spot for three consecutive weeks. The Last Dance was finally dethroned in its fourth weekend, making $7.3 million and finishing second behind newcomer Red One.

=== Critical response ===
On the review aggregator website Rotten Tomatoes, 40% of 219 critics' reviews are positive, with an average rating of 4.7/10. The website's consensus reads: "The always watchable Tom Hardy injects ample charisma into Venom: The Last Dance, but the offering buckles under its convoluted tonal ambitions." Metacritic, which uses a weighted average, assigned the film a score of 41 out of 100, based on 47 critics, indicating "mixed or average" reviews. Audiences polled by CinemaScore gave the film an average grade of "B–" on an A+ to F scale (the lowest of the trilogy), while those surveyed by PostTrak gave it a 73% overall positive score, with 55% saying they would "definitely recommend" it.

Christy Lemire of RogerEbert.com gave the film 1.5 out of 4 stars, writing, "When it leans hard into the inherent absurdity of its wacky, mismatched buddy antics, Venom: The Last Dance can be a total blast. Unfortunately, that doesn't happen nearly as often as it should." The Daily Telegraph's Robbie Collin gave it 1 out of 5 stars, calling it "a yammeringly moronic, teenage-boy-pandering eyesore of the old school, with little to offer any viewer whose age or counting ability exceeds the low 20s." He concluded, "As last dances go, it's the Macarena in film form." Kevin Maher of The Times also gave it 1 out of 5 stars, saying, "it's hugely dispiriting to watch Hardy sink so low. From the elegant character work of Stuart: A Life Backwards and Tinker Tailor Soldier Spy to a blank-eyed Marvel meathead whose greatest line is: 'We've got to get the codex as far away as possible!'" Alci Rengifo of Entertainment Voice wrote, "Venom as a franchise works as a comic book cousin of Lethal Weapon or any other popular series featuring an entertaining, mismatched duo." Amy Nicholson of The New York Times said, "Honestly, I'd rather watch Eddie and Venom dicker over pizza toppings than team up for something as banal as saving the planet."

Jake Cole of Slant Magazine gave the film 3 out of 4 stars, writing, "As the film progresses, it consistently escalates the stakes and scale of its action, which doesn't devolve into incomprehensible CG murk as it hurtles toward the climax." The Independent's Clarisse Loughrey wrote, "It's hard to say how these films will be remembered in the grand scheme of comic book history, but, with The Last Dance, we can at least be reminded that sometimes they actually managed to have fun with these things", and gave it 3 out of 5 stars.

=== Accolades ===
Accolades received by Venom: The Last Dance
Award	Date of ceremony	Category	Recipient	Result	Ref.
Saturn Awards	February 2, 2025	Best Science Fiction Film	Venom: The Last Dance	Nominated	
Visual Effects Society Awards	February 11, 2025	Outstanding Effects Simulations in a Photoreal Feature	Xavi Martin Ramirez, Oscar Dahlen, Hedi Namar, Yuri Yang (for "Water, Fire & Symbiote Effects")	Nominated	
Critics' Choice Super Awards	August 7, 2025	Best Superhero Movie	Venom: The Last Dance	Nominated	
Critics' Choice Super Awards	August 7, 2025	Best Actor in a Superhero Movie	Tom Hardy	Nominated	

== Viewership ==
According to data from Showlabs, Venom: The Last Dance ranked first on Netflix in the United States during the week of 24 February–2 March 2025.

== Future ==
Ahead of the film's release in October 2024, Kelly Marcel said that while The Last Dance concludes the story arc of Eddie Brock and Venom, it sets up the character Knull for future appearances within the Sony's Spider-Man Universe (SSU) and is the beginning of the character's story. While the film was intended as the conclusion of the Venom trilogy, Hardy expressed interest in reprising his role in the future and having his character crossover with Spider-Man, saying "never say never". In December 2024, TheWrap claimed Kraven the Hunter would be the final film in the SSU, but Variety disputed that claim and said that since Sony had not technically established a shared universe, they would continue to make films based on Spider-Man characters.

In February 2026, it was revealed an animated Venom film, which is set to be directed by Final Destination Bloodlines directors Zach Lipovsky and Adam Stein, was in pre-production with Tom Hardy attached as a producer, although it is unknown if he will be reprising the role of the title character or if it will be set in the same universe as the live-action films. However that August, Sony Pictures chairman Tom Rothman stated that there were no more spin-offs in development.

== See also ==
- List of comic-based films directed by women
