= Anne Weying =

Fictional character

Anne Weying She-Venom
- Anne Weying on The Amazing Spider-Man #375 (March 1993). Art by Mark Bagley.

Publication information
- Publisher: Marvel Comics
- First appearance: As Anne Weying: The Amazing Spider-Man #375 (March 1993); As She-Venom: Venom: Sinner Takes All #2 (September 1995; cameo appearance); Venom: Sinner Takes All #3 (October 1995; full appearance)
- Created by: As Anne Weying: David Michelinie (writer); Mark Bagley (artist); As She-Venom: Larry Hama (writer); Greg Luzniak (artist)

In-story information
- Species: Human
- Notable aliases: Anne Brock; She-Venom; Bride of Venom
- Abilities: Has all of Spider-Man's abilities; Shape-shifting; Cannot be detected by Spider-Man's spider sense

She-Venom (Anne Weying) is a fictional character appearing in American comic books published by Marvel Comics. She is the ex-wife of Eddie Brock. She is the first character who goes by the She-Venom identity, and she is also colloquially referred to as the Bride of Venom.

Michelle Williams portrays the character in Sony's Spider-Man Universe films Venom (2018) and Venom: Let There Be Carnage (2021).

== Publication history ==
Anne Weying first appeared in The Amazing Spider-Man #375 (March 1993), and was created by writer David Michelinie and artist Mark Bagley.

Weying made her first cameo appearance as She-Venom in Venom: Sinner Takes All #2 (September 1995), and her first full appearance was in Venom: Sinner Takes All #3 (October 1995). She was created by writer Larry Hama and artist Greg Luzniak.

She is the first character who goes by the She-Venom identity, preceding Patricia Robertson.

== Fictional character biography ==
Anne Weying is a lawyer and Eddie Brock's ex-wife. With Spider-Man, Weying confronts Brock, who had become Venom and kidnapped Spider-Man's parents Richard and Mary Parker. Weying manages to convince Brock to give up his vendetta. Later, Sin-Eater shoots Weying, to which the Venom symbiote temporarily bonded with her to save her life. Weying lashes out against the men who had hurt her with such violence that Brock is afraid for her and compels Venom to return to him.

Weying is later incarcerated by the police on a false charge, unrelated to her previous rampage, to trap Venom. Brock remotely brings Venom to Weying, allowing her to escape prison. Weying heads to the amusement park where she and Spider-Man had confronted Venom, only to intercept a raid on a gang of drug dealers. During the fight, Brock is badly injured by a flamethrower, prompting Weying to release the Venom symbiote to heal him.

Still reeling from the experience of bonding with Venom and unable to deal with Brock's return into her life, coupled with his desire to kill Spider-Man, sends Weying over the edge. Weying commits suicide after spotting Spider-Man in an older black costume at a time when his regular red and blue suit had been stolen.

In a flashback, it is revealed that Weying got pregnant with Eddie Brock's child after bonding to Venom. After giving birth to their son Dylan Brock, she left him in the care of Carl Brock, with the promise that she would return eventually. Weying died before she could return to Dylan, with Carl raising him in her stead.

== Reception ==
- In 2022, CBR.com ranked Anne Weying 7th in their "10 Most Powerful Lawyers In Marvel Comics" list.

== Other versions ==
=== Marvel 1602 ===
An alternate universe version of Anne Weying from King James' England, a Battleworld domain similar to the Marvel 1602 reality, appears in Secret Wars.

=== Venom Beyond ===
An alternate universe version of Anne Weying appears in the "Venom Beyond" storyline. This version bonded to the Venom symbiote after Eddie Brock killed himself before he could bond with Venom, with her rage and grief over Brock's death attracting Venom to her. Weying eventually gives birth to Dylan Brock, who is swayed by Knull and becomes the villainous Codex. To combat Codex, President Eugene Thompson recruits Weying into the Sym-Soldier program, where she leads a group of symbiote heroes consisting of Peter Parker, Wade Wilson, Cletus Kasady, and Andi Benton.

== In other media ==
=== Film ===
Anne Weying appears in films set in Sony's Spider-Man Universe, portrayed by Michelle Williams.

- First appearing in Venom (2018), this version is the ex-fiancée of Eddie Brock, a former lawyer for the Life Foundation turned district attorney, and girlfriend of Dr. Dan Lewis. Upon learning about the Venom symbiote, she reluctantly helps him and Brock thwart Carlton Drake and Riot's plot to bring more symbiotes to Earth, during which she briefly bonds with Venom to save Brock from Roland Treece. Afterward, she reconciles with Brock while remaining friends with him.
- Weying appears in Venom: Let There Be Carnage. After becoming engaged to Lewis, the pair help Brock and Venom fight Cletus Kasady / Carnage and Frances Barrison.

=== Video games ===
- Anne Weying / She-Venom appears as a playable character in Spider-Man Unlimited.
- Anne Weying / She-Venom, based on her appearance in the Venom films, appears as a cosmetic character outfit in Fortnite.

=== Novels ===
Ann Weying appears in the 1998 novel Spider-Man: Venom's Wrath.
