= Scott Rosenberg =

American actor, screenwriter, and producer (born 1963)

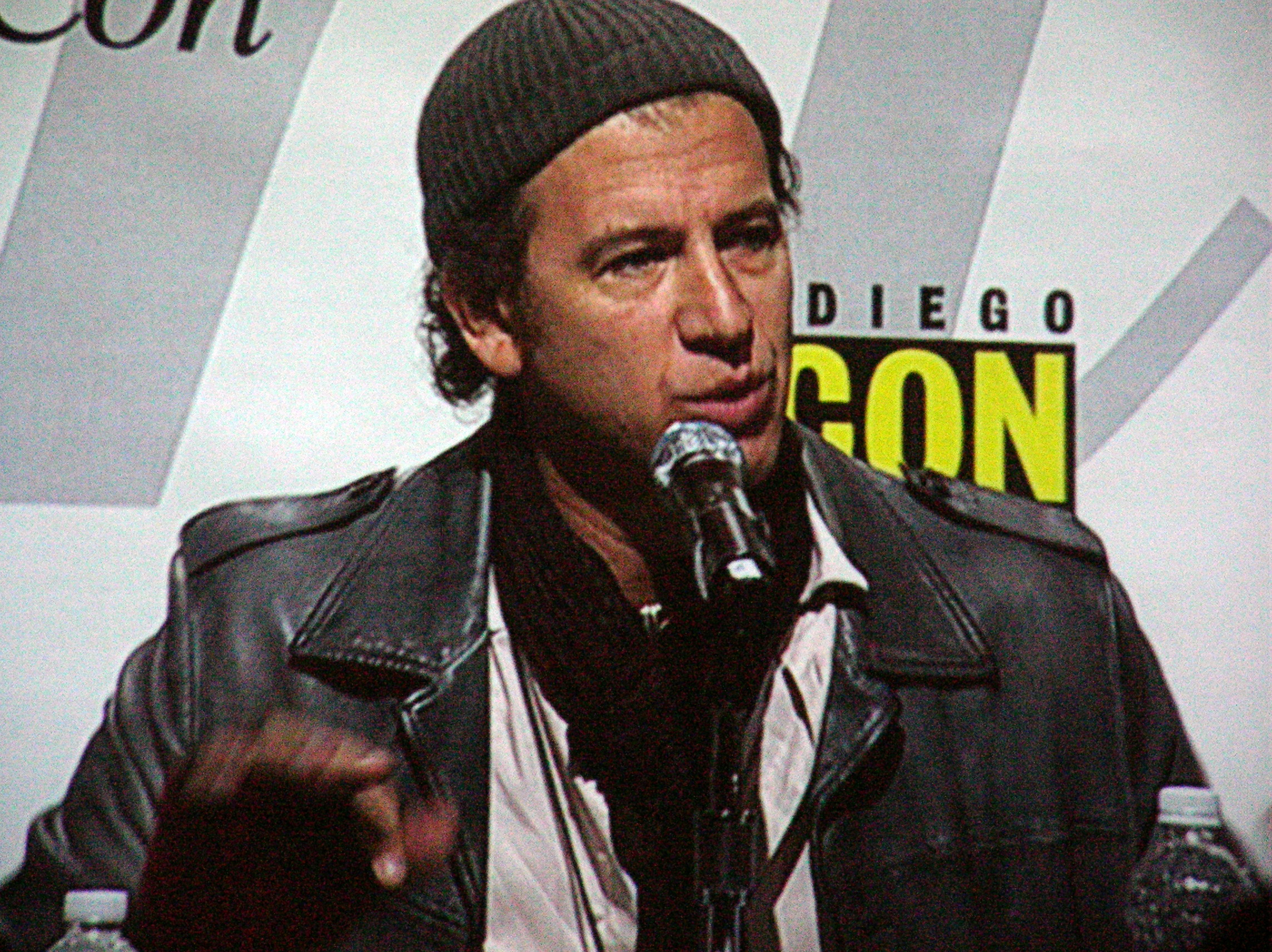
- Rosenberg at the 2010 WonderCon
- Born: April 24, 1963 (age 63); Needham, Massachusetts, U.S.
- Occupations: Actor; screenwriter; film producer

Scott Rosenberg (born April 24, 1963) is an American screenwriter, film producer, and actor.

== Life and career ==
Rosenberg was born in Needham, Massachusetts, to a Jewish family. After high school graduation in 1981, he attended Boston University, from which he received his bachelor's degree in 1985. He earned his MFA from UCLA. While at UCLA, he had entered a screenwriting contest, in which he came in third place, and as a result, signed with his first agent. His big break came when producer Joel Silver bought his script, "Love Lies Bleeding", and he wrote an episode for the television show, Tales from the Crypt. His screenwriting credits include major motion pictures such as Con Air and Gone in 60 Seconds.

During production of the film Domestic Disturbance in April 2001, Rosenberg was arrested along with actor Vince Vaughn after a bar brawl in Wilmington, North Carolina. The scuffle broke out at the Firebelly Lounge, where actor Steve Buscemi was stabbed that night in the face, throat, and arm.

On Beautiful Girls, 1996, starring Timothy Hutton, Matt Dillon, and Uma Thurman, Rosenberg said:

It was the worst winter ever in this small hometown. Snow plows were coming by, and I was just tired of writing these movies with people getting shot and killed. So I said, 'There is more action going on in my hometown with my friends dealing with the fact that they can't deal with turning 30 or with commitment' – all that became Beautiful Girls.

In October 2015, Rosenberg was brought in to rewrite Jumanji: Welcome to the Jungle with his writing partner Jeff Pinkner. In February 2018, Rosenberg, Pinkner and director Jake Kasdan were expected to return to the film's sequel.

In March 2025, it was announced Rosenberg and Josh Appelbaum will produce an eight- episode live action Scooby-Doo series for Netflix.

== Filmography ==
=== Film ===
Year	Title	Writer	Producer
1995	Things to Do in Denver When You're Dead	Yes	Associate
1996	Beautiful Girls	Yes	Associate
1997	Con Air	Yes	No
1998	Disturbing Behavior	Yes	Co-producer
2000	High Fidelity	Adaptation	No
2000	Gone in 60 Seconds	Yes	No
2001	Impostor	Adaptation	No
2002	Highway	Yes	Yes
2003	Kangaroo Jack	Yes	No
2003	February	No	Co-producer
2017	Jumanji: Welcome to the Jungle	Yes	No
2018	Venom	Yes	No
2019	Jumanji: The Next Level	Yes	Executive
2023	Dashing Through the Snow	Yes	No
2026	Jumanji: Open World	Yes	Executive

Uncredited revisions

- Armageddon (1998)
- The General's Daughter (1999)
- Domestic Disturbance (2001)
- Spider-Man (2002)
- Runaway Jury (2003)
- Pain & Gain (2013)
- Kristy (2014)

Unproduced screenplays

- The Black Ice (1992)
- The Ten (1996)
- Johnny Diamond (1997)
- Bad Moon Rising (1997) - Later published as a graphic novel.
- The Sentinel (2003) - Remake of the 1977 film of the same name.
- Lets Get Harry (2003) - Remake of the 1986 film of the same name.
- And So it Goes (2003)
- Bit Players (2003)
- The Dirty Dozen (2006) - Remake of the 1967 film of the same name.
- Already Dead (2007)
- The Hauntrepreneur (2011)
- Grasshopper Jungle (2014)

Special thanks

- Wonderland (2003)
- Cloverfield (2008)
- Closing Time (2010) (Short film)

==== Acting roles ====
Year	Film	Role	Notes
1992	Bimbo Penitentiary	Dreg	
1997	Con Air	Garland's Craps Dealer	Uncredited
1998	There's Something About Mary	Jailbird	
1999	The General's Daughter	MP Guard	
2000	Gone in 60 Seconds	Private Doctor	
2000	Me, Myself and Irene	Softball Player	
2005	Fever Pitch	1980's Sox Player	

=== Television ===
TV films

Year	Title	Writer	Executive producer
1992	Air Time	Yes	No
1997	Cyclops Baby	Yes	No
2016	Transylvania	No	Yes
2017	Salamander	Yes	Yes

TV series

Year	Title	Writer	Executive producer	Creator	Notes
1993	Tales from the Crypt	Yes	No	No	Episode "Forever Ambergris"
2001–2002	Going to California	Yes	Yes	Yes	Wrote episode "I Know Why the Caged Rhino Sings"
2007–2008	October Road	Yes	Yes	Yes	Wrote 9 episodes
2008	Samurai Girl	No	Yes	No	
2008–2009	Life on Mars	Yes	Yes	Yes	Wrote episodes "Out Here in the Fields" and "Life Is a Rock"
2010	Happy Town	Yes	Yes	Yes	Wrote episodes "In This Home on Ice", "I Came to Haplin for the Waters" and "Blame It on Rio Bravo"
2014	Star-Crossed	No	Yes	No	
2015–2017	Zoo	Yes	Yes	Yes	Wrote episodes "Fight or Flight", "The Cheese Stands Alone" and "That Great Big Hill of Hope"
2017–2019	Knightfall	No	Yes	No	
2018	Everything Sucks!	No	Yes	No	
2018	Origin	No	Yes	No	
2019	Limetown	No	Yes	No	
2020	High Fidelity	No	Yes	No	
2021	Cowboy Bebop	No	Yes	No	
2022–present	From	No	Yes	No	
2023–present	Citadel	No	Yes	No	
2027	Scooby-Doo: Origins	Yes	Yes	Yes	
