= Amanda Brennan =

American writer

- Education: Rutgers University (MLIS); Drew University (BA)
- Occupations: librarian, blogger, writer

Amanda Brennan is the former Head of Editorial at Tumblr and is known as the "meme librarian." At Tumblr, she sorted through site's content and cataloged trends. She began her career at Know Your Meme where she gained her nickname. Due to her history of cataloging trends, she has also been called "The Librarian for the Internet." She is frequently quoted in the press because of her expertise on internet memes and statistics about internet memes.

== Education and early life ==
Brennan attended Drew University, graduating in 2008 with a Bachelor of Arts in English Literature and a minor in Linguistics. In 2011 she earned her Master of Library and Information Science degree from Rutgers University.

== Meme librarianship ==
In a 2014 interview for the Library of Congress blog, Brennan describes the importance of cataloging memes, saying "Recording these smaller moments are like recording local history, tiny bits that make up a whole that would have been incomplete in the future. They're also representative of how current culture reacts to life, which will be important to understand how this era thought about the world." She continued those thoughts in 2015, remarking to the Washington Post that, "The importance of sitting down to find these sources gives the creator the credit he/she deserves. Sometimes it gets buried under all the we-heart-its and the rebloggys, but without sitting down and saying, "This is important," the creator loses his content – and that's not fair."

Additionally, Brennan has been vital in developing Tumblr's Fandometrics.

== Publications ==
- "Librarians and Felines: A History of Defying the 'Cat Lady' Stereotype", Dorothy Gambrell and Amanda Brennan, in The librarian stereotype: Deconstructing perceptions and presentations of information work. 2014
- "Everyday I'm Tumblin': Strengthening Your Library's Community Through Tumblr" presented at NJLA conference, 2012.
