= 45th Golden Raspberry Awards =

Award ceremony for worst in film in 2024

- Awarded for: Worst in film
- Date: February 28, 2025
- Site: Los Angeles, California

Highlights
- Worst Picture: Madame Web
- Most awards: Madame Web (3)
- Most nominations: Joker: Folie à Deux (7)

The 45th Golden Raspberry Awards, or the Razzies, honored the worst films released in 2024 on February 28, 2025. The awards are based on votes from members of the Golden Raspberry Foundation. The nominees were initially set to be announced on January 16, 2025; due to the Southern California wildfires, however, the announcement was delayed to January 18 and again to January 22, before they were eventually announced a day early on January 21.

Winners were announced a day early before the originally scheduled date (March 1) on February 28.

The nominations were selected through emailed ballots by 1,202 Razzie members: movie enthusiasts, film critics, and journalists from 49 U.S. states and approximately two dozen other countries, who identified the top five contenders in each of the nine categories.

== Winners and nominees ==
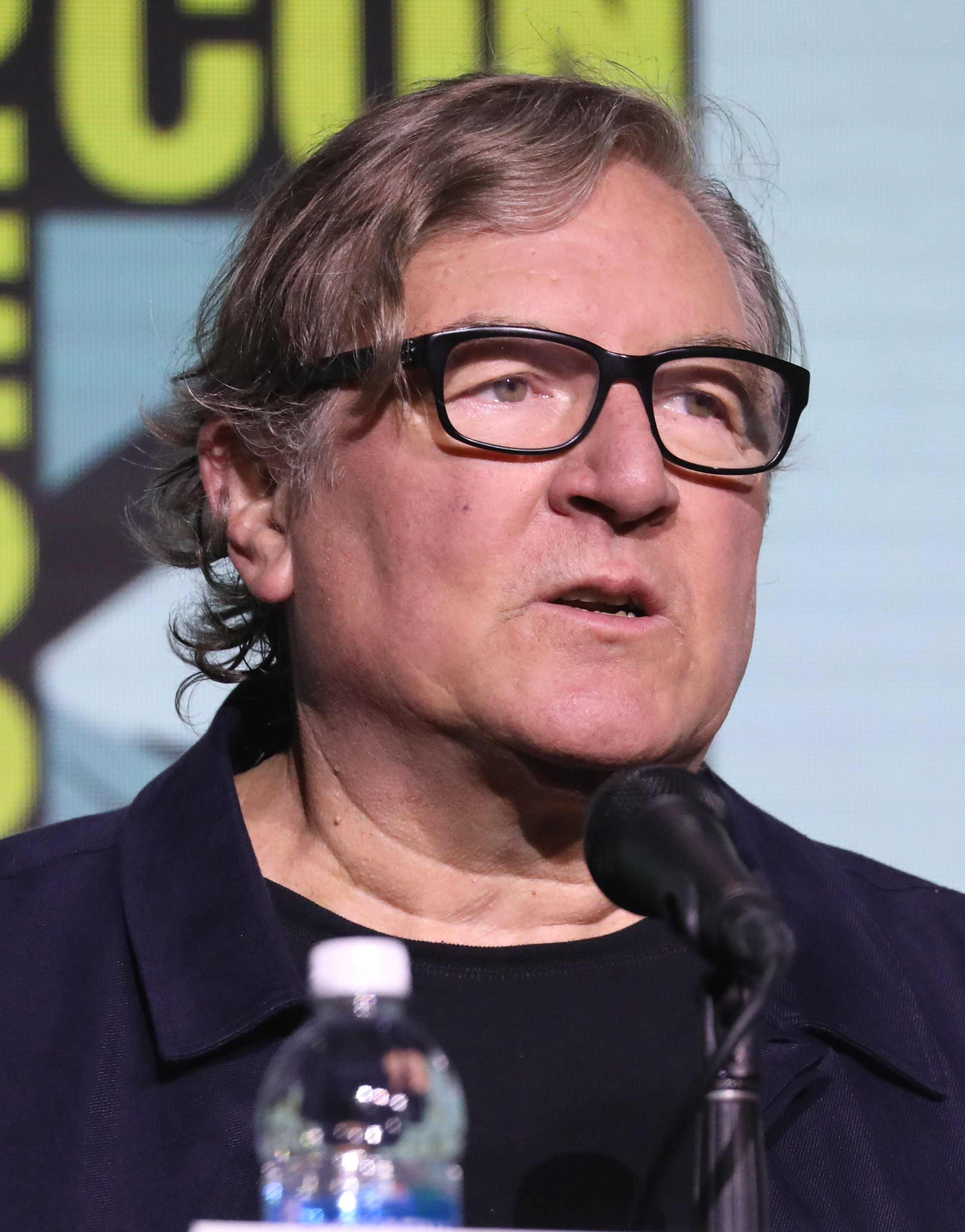
Lorenzo di Bonaventura, Worst Picture winner

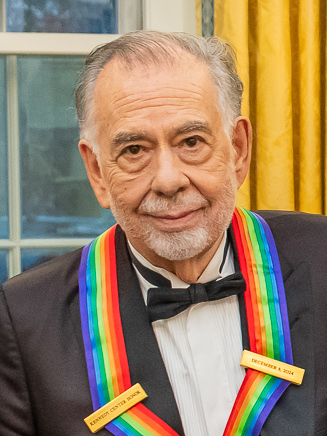
Francis Ford Coppola, Worst Director winner

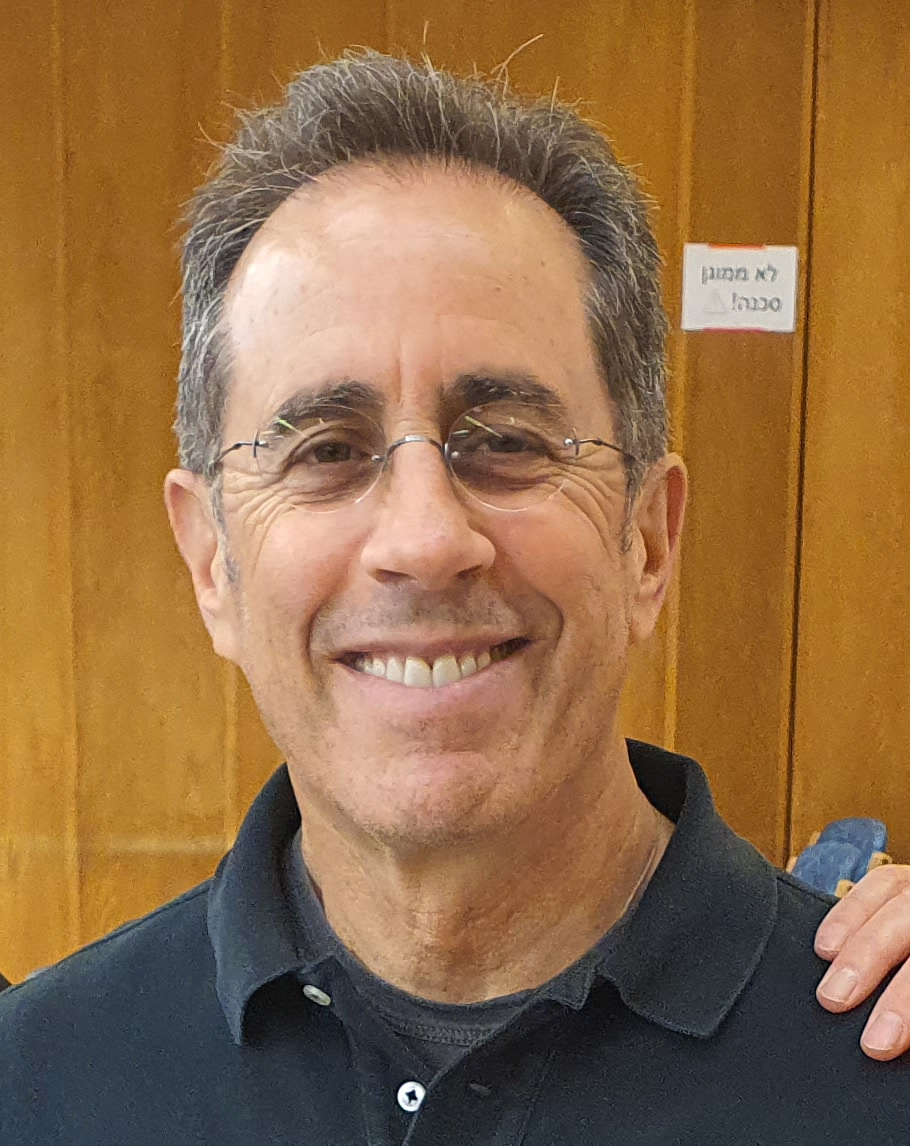
Jerry Seinfeld, Worst Actor winner

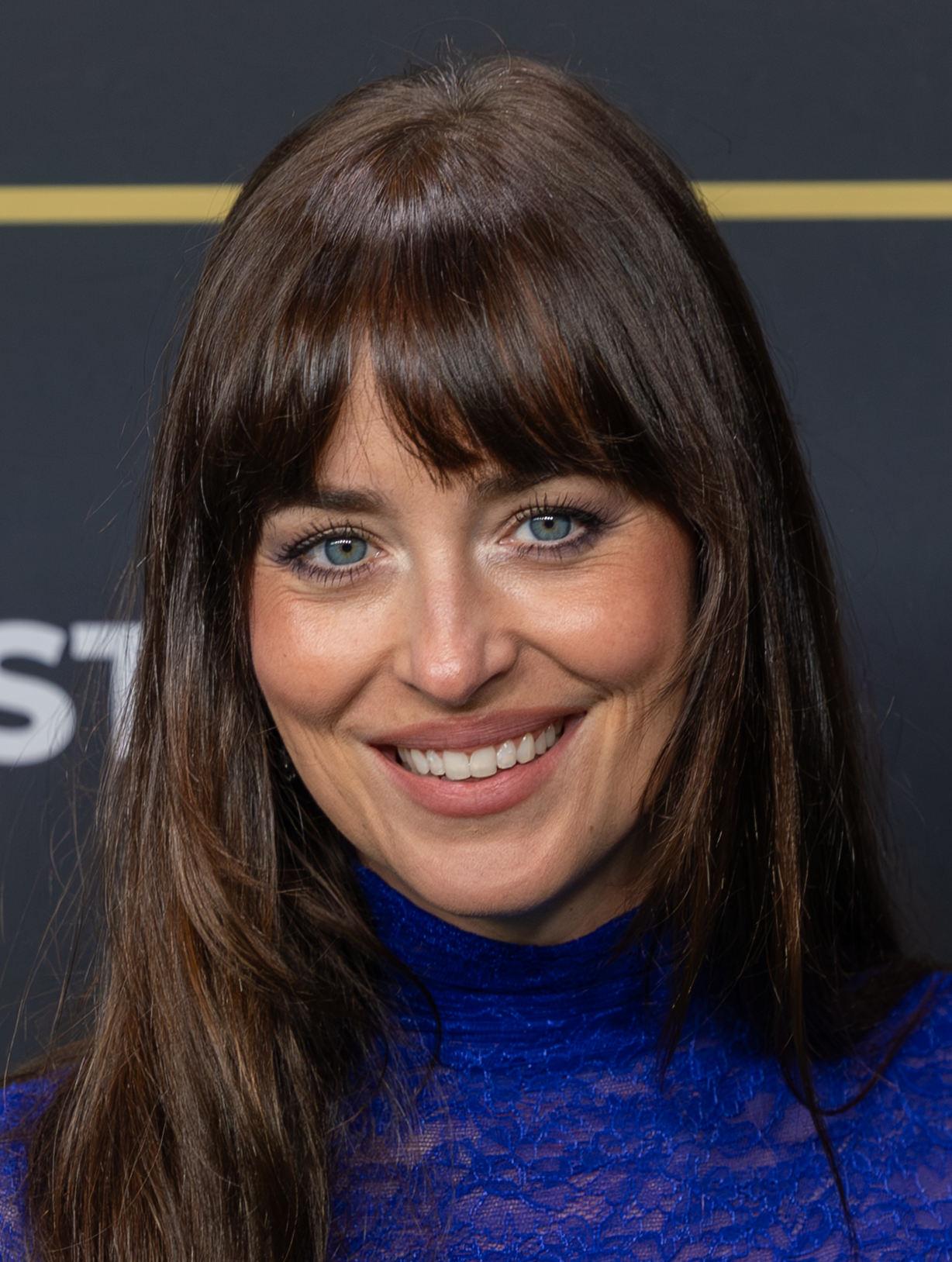
Dakota Johnson, Worst Actress winner

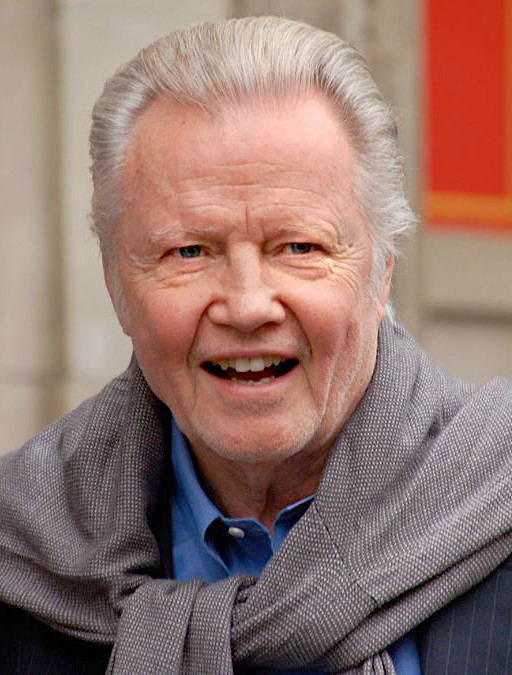
Jon Voight, Worst Supporting Actor winner

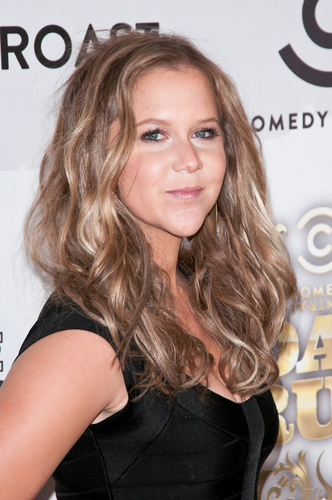
Amy Schumer, Worst Supporting Actress winner

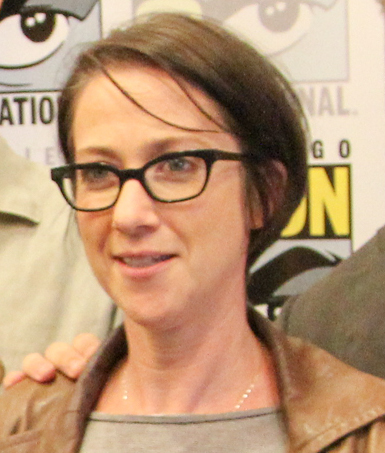
S. J. Clarkson, Worst Screenplay co-winner

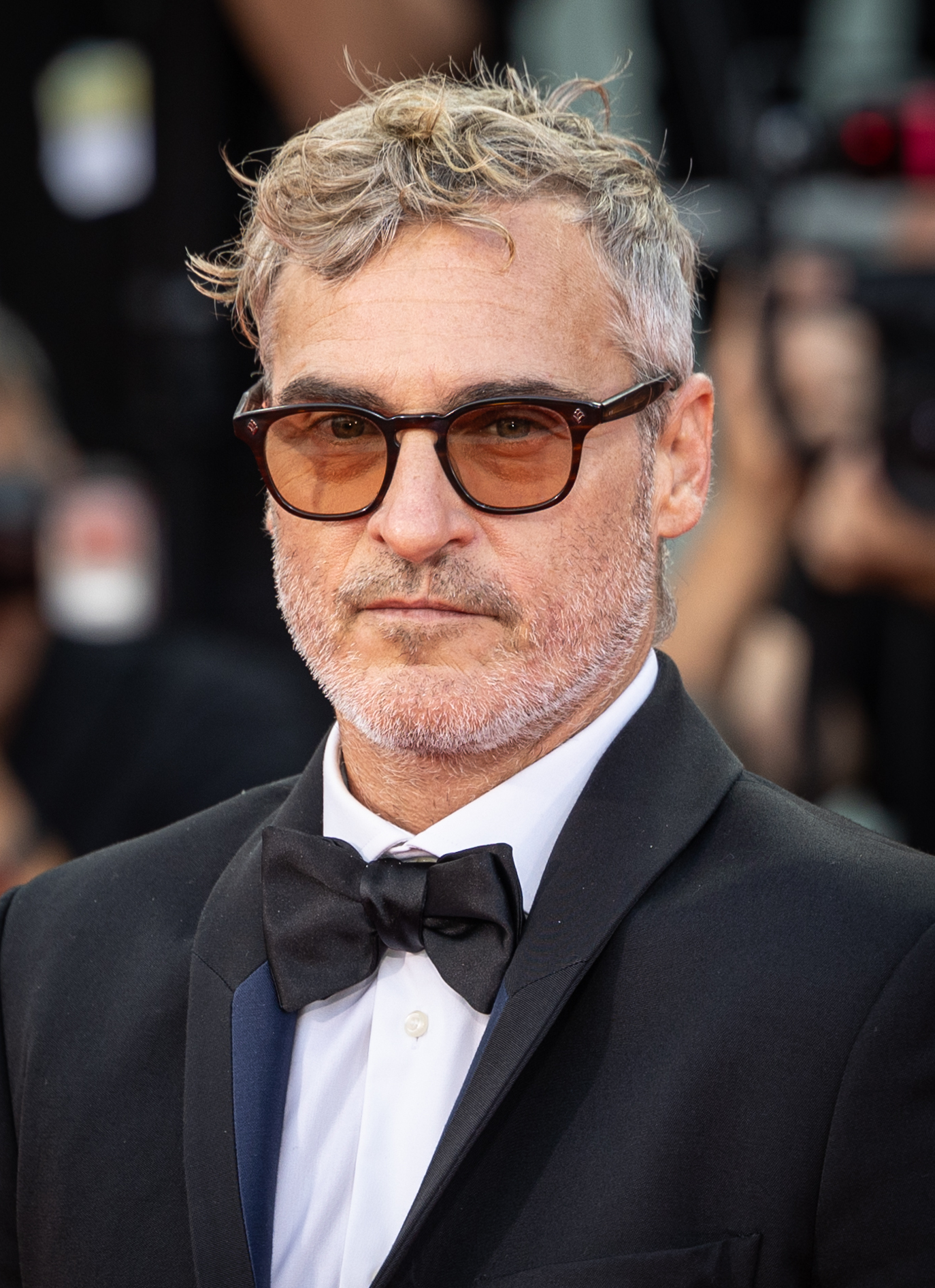
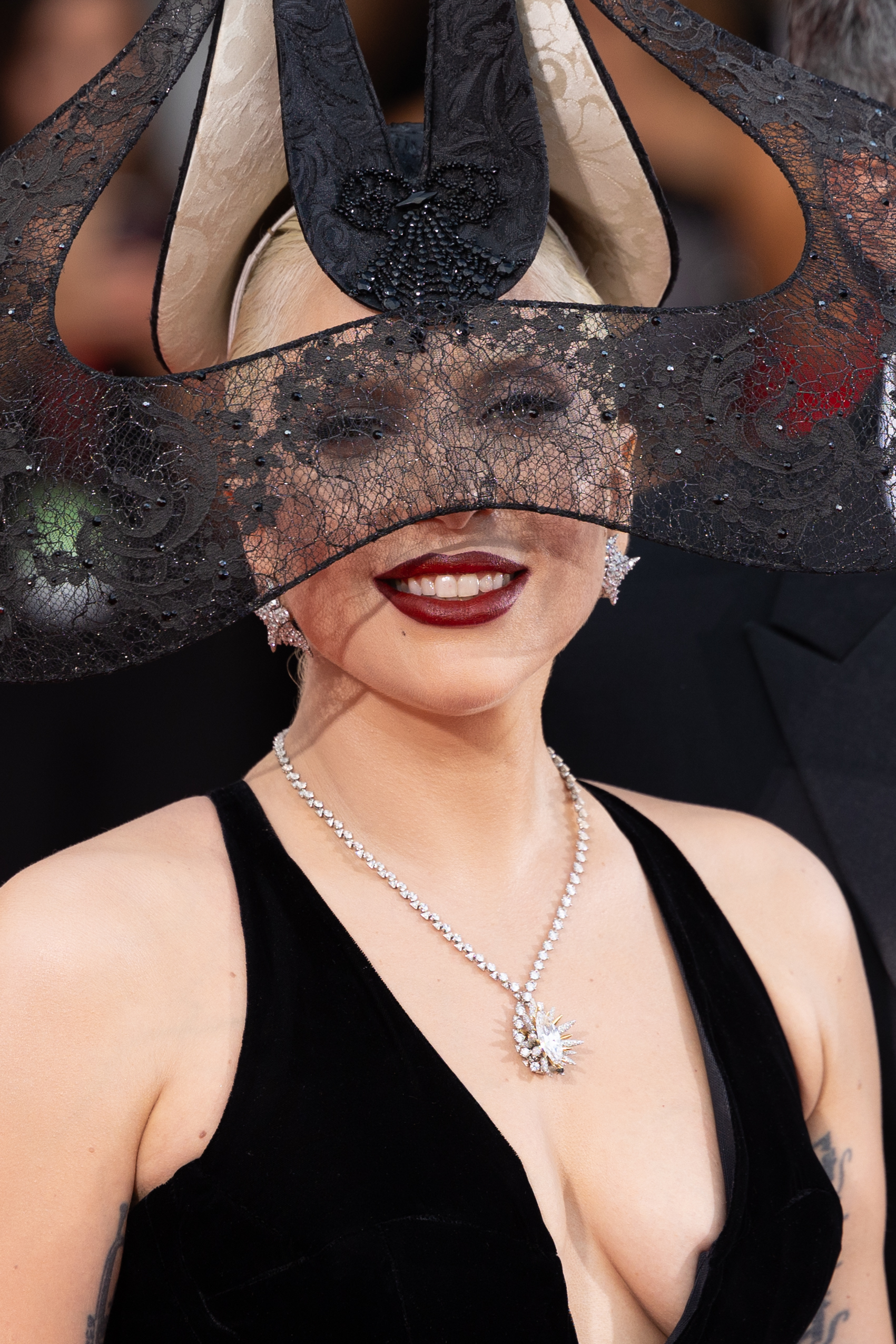
Joaquin Phoenix and Lady Gaga, Worst Screen Combo winners

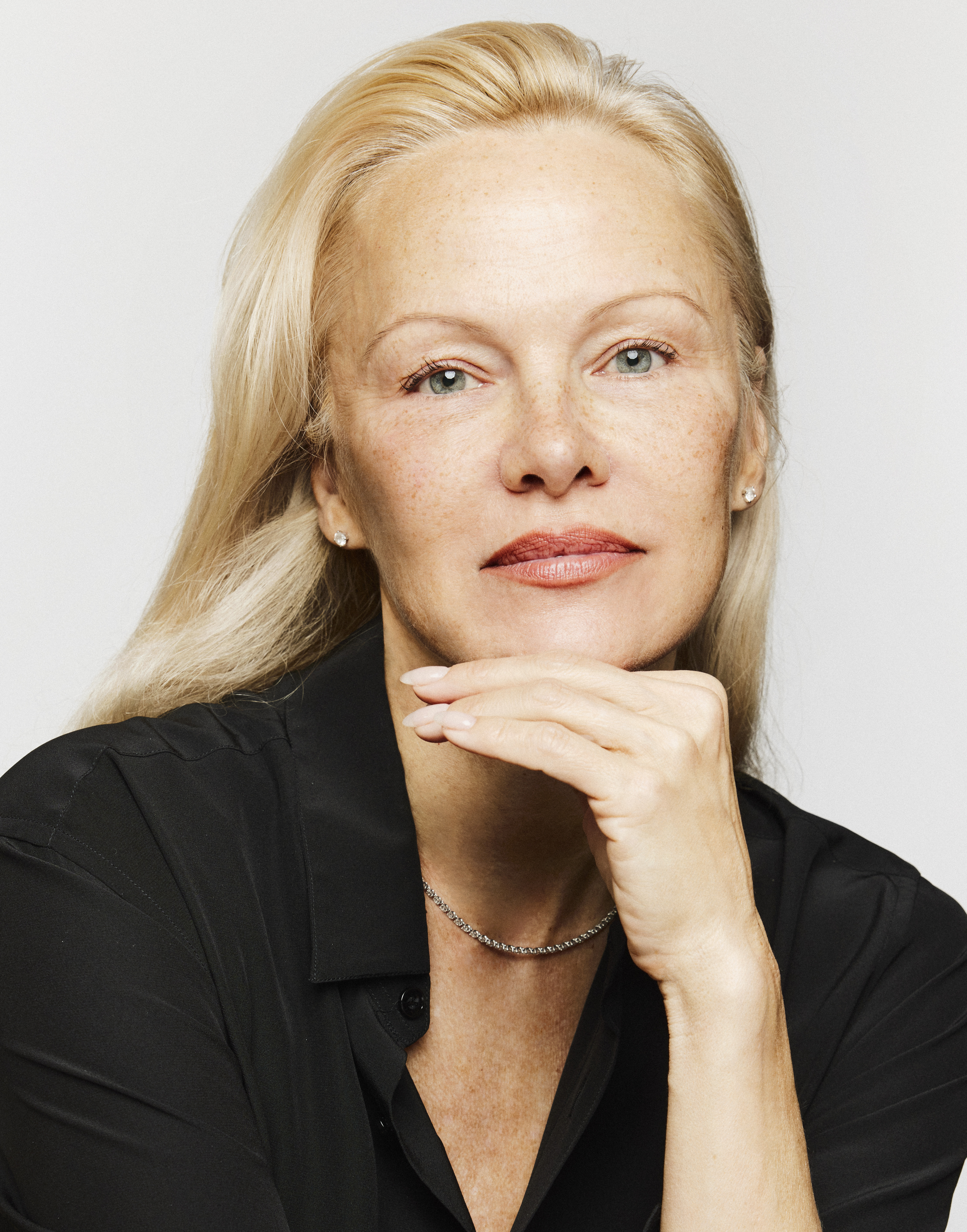
Pamela Anderson, Razzie Redeemer Award winner

Worst Picture: Madame Web (Columbia / Sony Pictures Releasing) – Lorenzo di Bonaventura; Borderlands (Lionsgate) – Ari Arad, Avi Arad, and Erik Feig; Joker: Folie à Deux (Warner Bros.) – Joseph Garner, Emma Tillinger Koskoff, and Todd Phillips; Megalopolis (Lionsgate) – Michael Bederman, Francis Ford Coppola, Barry Hirsch, and Fred Roos; Reagan (ShowBiz Direct) – Mark Joseph	Worst Director: Francis Ford Coppola – Megalopolis; S. J. Clarkson – Madame Web; Todd Phillips – Joker: Folie à Deux; Eli Roth – Borderlands; Jerry Seinfeld – Unfrosted
Worst Actor: Jerry Seinfeld – Unfrosted as Bob Cabana; Jack Black – Dear Santa as Asmodeus / "Satan" / "Santa Claus"; Zachary Levi – Harold and the Purple Crayon as Harold; Joaquin Phoenix – Joker: Folie à Deux as Arthur Fleck / Joker; Dennis Quaid – Reagan as Ronald Reagan	Worst Actress: Dakota Johnson – Madame Web as Cassandra Webb; Cate Blanchett – Borderlands as Lilith; Lady Gaga – Joker: Folie à Deux as Harleen "Lee" Quinzel; Bryce Dallas Howard – Argylle as Elly Conway; Jennifer Lopez – Atlas as Atlas Shepherd
Worst Supporting Actor: Jon Voight – Megalopolis, Reagan, Shadow Land, and Strangers as Hamilton Crassus III, Viktor Petrovich, Robert Wainwright, and Richard Evans (respectively); Jack Black – Borderlands as Claptrap (voice only); Kevin Hart – Borderlands as Roland Greaves; Shia LaBeouf – Megalopolis as Clodio Pulcher (in drag); Tahar Rahim – Madame Web as Ezekiel Sims	Worst Supporting Actress: Amy Schumer – Unfrosted as Marjorie Post; Ariana DeBose – Argylle and Kraven the Hunter as Keira and Calypso Ezili (respectively); Lesley-Anne Down – Reagan as Margaret Thatcher; Emma Roberts – Madame Web as Mary Parker; FKA Twigs – The Crow as Shelly Webster
Worst Screen Combo: Joaquin Phoenix & Lady Gaga – Joker: Folie à Deux; Any two obnoxious characters (but especially Jack Black) – Borderlands; Any two unfunny "comedic actors" – Unfrosted; The entire cast of Megalopolis; Dennis Quaid & Penelope Ann Miller (as "Ronnie & Nancy") – Reagan	Worst Remake, Rip-off or Sequel: Joker: Folie à Deux (Warner Bros.); The Crow (Lionsgate); Kraven the Hunter (Columbia / Sony Pictures Releasing); Mufasa: The Lion King (Disney); Rebel Moon 2: The Scargiver (Netflix)
Worst Screenplay: Madame Web – screenplay by Matt Sazama, Burk Sharpless, Claire Parker, and S. J. Clarkson; story by Kerem Sanga, Matt Sazama, and Burk Sharpless (based on characters by Marvel Comics); Joker: Folie à Deux – screenplay by Scott Silver and Todd Phillips (based on characters by DC Comics); Kraven the Hunter – screenplay by Art Marcum, Matt Holloway, and Richard Wenk; story by Richard Wenk (based on characters by Marvel Comics); Megalopolis – screenplay by Francis Ford Coppola; Reagan – screenplay by Howard Klausner (based on the book The Crusader: Ronald Reagan and the Fall of Communism by Paul Kengor)	Razzie Redeemer Award: Pamela Anderson (Note: Previously won Worst New Star for Barb Wire (1996).) – The Last Showgirl; Megan Fox (Note: Previously won Worst Actress for Johnny & Clyde (2023) and Worst Supporting Actress for Teenage Mutant Ninja Turtles (2014) and Expend4bles (2023).) – Subservience; Demi Moore (Note: Previously won Worst Actress for The Juror (1996), Striptease (1996) and G.I. Jane (1997), and Worst Supporting Actress for Charlie's Angels: Full Throttle (2003).) – The Substance

=== Films with multiple nominations ===
The following films received multiple nominations:

Films with multiple nominations
Nominations	Film
7	Joker: Folie à Deux
6	Borderlands
6	Madame Web
6	Megalopolis
6	Reagan
4	Unfrosted
3	Kraven the Hunter
2	Argylle
2	The Crow

=== Films with multiple wins ===
The following films received multiple awards:

Films with multiple awards
Wins	Film
3	Madame Web
2	Joker: Folie à Deux
2	Megalopolis
2	Unfrosted

== Ceremony information ==
A majority of this year's nominees were comic book adaptations and superhero films, receiving eighteen nominations overall, which consists of The Crow, Joker: Folie à Deux, Kraven the Hunter, and Madame Web. Joker: Folie à Deux received the most nominations with seven, including Worst Picture, Worst Director (Todd Phillips) and Worst Remake, Rip-off or Sequel; conversely, the 2019 original film received the most nominations, with eleven, at the 92nd Academy Awards, which itself caused some controversy, in 2020. Furthermore, the first film received a lone Razzie nomination for Worst Reckless Disregard for Human Life and Public Property, which received criticism, losing to Rambo: Last Blood, in 2020. Folie à Deux, however, set the record as the first direct sequel to be nominated for Worst Picture, Worst Director, and Worst Screenplay following the previous installment receiving Academy Award nominations for Best Picture, Best Director, and Best Adapted Screenplay. In a press release, the Razzies described and panned the jukebox musical as "a highly anticipated comic-book based sequel that had its protagonists express their mental illness and villainy — by singing and dancing!" Furthermore, it is the fifth film to be nominated for Worst Picture based on DC publications. (Note: Batman & Robin (1997), Catwoman (2004), Batman v Superman: Dawn of Justice (2016), and Shazam! Fury of the Gods (2023) were the four previous DC films to be nominated for Worst Picture.) Since its release in February 2024, Madame Web was considered "a serious Razzie contender" (according to the Razzies), and was predicted by several entertainment news outlets as a frontrunner to be nominated for multiple categories. Overall, multiple film journalists have considered 2024 to be one of the "worst" years for comic book/superhero films, with both Folie à Deux and Madame Web being the most mentioned and written about.

Among the previous Academy Award winners receiving nominations were Cate Blanchett, (Note: Won Best Supporting Actress for The Aviator (2004) and Best Actress for Blue Jasmine (2013); nominated this year for Worst Actress for Borderlands.) Francis Ford Coppola, (Note: Won Best Original Screenplay for Patton (1970), Best Adapted Screenplay for The Godfather (1972), and Best Picture, Best Director and Best Adapted Screenplay for The Godfather Part II (1974); nominated this year for Worst Picture, Worst Director, and Worst Screenplay for Megalopolis.) Ariana DeBose, (Note: Won Best Supporting Actress for West Side Story (2021); nominated this year for Worst Supporting Actress for Argylle and Kraven the Hunter.) Lady Gaga, (Note: Won Best Original Song for "Shallow" from A Star Is Born (2018); nominated this year for Worst Actress and Worst Screen Combo (shared with Joaquin Phoenix) for Joker: Folie à Deux.) Joaquin Phoenix (Note: Won Best Actor for Joker (2019); nominated this year for Worst Actor and Worst Screen Combo (shared with Lady Gaga) for Joker: Folie à Deux.) and Jon Voight, (Note: Won Best Actor for Coming Home (1978); nominated and won this year for Worst Supporting Actor for Megalopolis, Reagan, Shadow Land, and Strangers. Additionally, won Worst Actor at the previous ceremony for Mercy (2023).) the latter being one of President Donald Trump's appointed "Ambassadors to Hollywood" (alongside multiple Razzie-winning actors Mel Gibson and Sylvester Stallone), who was nominated for his performances in a "near record" four films in a single year. Phoenix also holds the rare distinction of receiving a Razzie nomination for acting for the same role he won the Academy Award for Best Actor for in 2020. Jennifer Lopez and Voight were also nominated again following their respective nomination and win at the previous ceremony for The Mother and Mercy. Voight ultimately won, while Gaga and Phoenix both won for Worst Screen Combo; the latter two becoming Oscar- and Razzie-winning performers. The following month, during her monologue on Saturday Night Live as host, Gaga mocked Folie à Deux, and acknowledged and joked about her and Phoenix's win, saying "Joke's on them. I love winning things!", and that she is one step closer to an "EGORT".

Coppola became the fourth individual to win the Razzie Award for Worst Director and the Academy Award for Best Director after Michael Cimino, Kevin Costner, and Tom Hooper. Accepting the honor, Coppola posted on his Instagram account: "I am thrilled to accept the Razzie Award in so many important categories for Megalopolis, and for the distinctive honor of being nominated as the Worst Director, Worst Screenplay, and Worst Picture."

In June 2025, when Dakota Johnson was a guest on the podcast Good Hang with Amy Poehler, she admitted that after receiving news of her Worst Actress win she contacted the Golden Raspberry Award Foundation asking for her award. Johnson also shared that she had to take to stride the negative reception of a project that became "a completely different script than what I [was] attached to" due to heavy studio interference, saying, "Like, what am I gonna do? Fucking cry about Madame Web? No. I'm gonna laugh." She also revealed that previous Worst Actress winner Sandra Bullock (for 2009's All About Steve) sent her a voice note, saying, "I heard you are in the Razzie Club and we should have brunch. We should have like a monthly brunch."

Furthermore, this year contained the rare scenario of an actor appearing in both a Best Picture nominee (at the Academy Awards) and Worst Picture nominee, with Dennis Quaid appearing in both Reagan (Worst Picture) and The Substance (Best Picture).

In response to his nomination for Worst Actor for Harold and the Purple Crayon, Zachary Levi posted on his X account: "Some great actors have been nominated for Razzies. I'll take it as a front-handed compliment."
