= Pierre Roche =

Pierre Roche may refer to:

- Pierre Roche (sculptor)
- Pierre Roche (musician)
