= Matt Sazama and Burk Sharpless =

American screenwriters

- Born: United States
- Occupation: Screenwriter
- Years active: 2014–present
- Known for: Lost in Space; Dracula Untold; The Last Witch Hunter; Gods of Egypt; Morbius; Madame Web
- Parent: John Sharpless (Burk Sharpless only)

Matt Sazama and Burk Sharpless are American writers best known for writing films together. After writing two moderate box office success films with Dracula Untold (2014) and The Last Witch Hunter (2015), Sazama and Sharpless wrote Gods of Egypt (2016), Morbius (2022) and Madame Web (2024), all of which became box office bombs and received negative reception from critics. The duo also wrote a reboot of Lost in Space for Netflix, which contrary to their other work, has been well received.

== Career ==
In August 2008, Sazama and Sharpless were hired by Sony Pictures to write the script for a film adaptation of Flash Gordon, with Breck Eisner attached as director.

In January 2011, 20th Century Fox hired Sazama and Sharpless to adapt Atari's 1980s arcade game Missile Command. In August 2011, Universal Pictures hired Sazama and Sharpless to write the script for a feature film based on the Hasbro board game Cluedo. In September 2011, Chernin Entertainment bought an untitled pitch by Sazama and Sharpless, which was described as a futuristic Jungle Book.

Sazama and Sharpless wrote the script for the 2014 horror fantasy film Dracula Untold, starring Luke Evans, Sarah Gadon, and Dominic Cooper. The film was directed by Gary Shore and released in the United States by Universal Pictures on October 10, 2014.

Sazama and Sharpless also rewrote Cory Goodman's original draft of the 2015 fantasy thriller film The Last Witch Hunter, starring Vin Diesel, Elijah Wood, Rose Leslie, Julie Engelbrecht, and Michael Caine. Eisner directed the film, which was released on October 23, 2015, by Summit Entertainment.

In addition, Sazama and Sharpless wrote the screenplay for the fantasy action film Gods of Egypt, starring Nikolaj Coster-Waldau, Brenton Thwaites, Gerard Butler, Chadwick Boseman, and Geoffrey Rush. The film, directed by Alex Proyas, was released on February 26, 2016, by Lionsgate. Sazama and Sharpless also contributed to the story of the 2017 Power Rangers reboot.

In June 2015, Walt Disney Pictures hired Sazama and Sharpless to write a live-action adaptation of the Night on Bald Mountain sequence from the 1940s animated film Fantasia, which they would also executive produce. Though as of 2025, no further updates have been made.

In November 2015, Netflix announced a remake of the 1965 TV series Lost in Space, hiring Sazama and Sharpless to write.

In 2017, it was announced that Sony Pictures hired the duo to pen the script for the film adaptation of Marvel Comics character, Morbius, the Living Vampire. The film is part of their shared universe titled Sony's Spider-Man Universe. They also wrote a film adaptation of Madame Web, which was released on February 14, 2024.

=== Reception ===
Following the release of Madame Web, Sazama and Sharpless suddenly gained infamous attention due to their history of being "franchise killers". Philip Ellis of Men's Health referred to the duo's work as "middling genre fare that seeks not to expand or buck conventions, but rather to deliver trope after trope, revelling in cliché where other writers might shy away. In other words, the kind of movie you'll get a kick out of when you're slightly drunk and/or sleepy at 20,000 feet." Sazama and Sharpless have been publicly mocked online with users questioning their ability to write and Hollywood's insistence on rehiring them for large budget projects. While Alex Zalben of Comic Book Club agreed that the duo's work is subpar, he noted that their work on Lost in Space has been better received stating, "I don't know these guys. I don't have a dog in this race. But I'd venture a Netflix show they were actually in charge of is probably a better representation of their talent than multiple work-for-hire movies where they wrote an often intermediary version of a screenplay."

== Filmography ==
Film

Year	Title	Director	Notes
2014	Dracula Untold	Gary Shore	
2015	The Last Witch Hunter	Breck Eisner	Co-wrote with Cory Goodman
2016	Gods of Egypt	Alex Proyas	
2017	Power Rangers	Dean Israelite	Story only Co-wrote with Kieran Mulroney, Michele Mulroney, and John Gatins
2022	Morbius	Daniel Espinosa	
2024	Madame Web	S. J. Clarkson	Co-wrote with Claire Parker, Clarkson, and Kerem Sanga

Television

- Lost in Space (2018–2021) (showrunners and executive producers)
