= Cassandra Webb =

Cassandra Webb may refer to:

- Cassandra Webb (actress), Australian-American actress
- Madame Web, fictional character in the Spider-Man universe
