= Julia Carpenter =

Comic book superheroine

Julia Carpenter Spider-Woman
- Julia Carpenter as Spider-Woman in Secret Wars #7 (November 1984). Art by Mike Zeck.

Publication information
- Publisher: Marvel Comics
- First appearance: As Spider-Woman: Cameo appearance: Secret Wars #6 (October 1984); Full appearance: Secret Wars #7 (November 1984); As Arachne: Ms. Marvel #6 (August 2006); As Madame Web: The Amazing Spider-Man #637 (July 2010)
- Created by: Jim Shooter; Mike Zeck

In-story information
- Full name: Julia Eugenia Cornwall Carpenter
- Species: Human mutate
- Team affiliations: Omega Flight; West Coast Avengers; Force Works; Freedom Force; Secret Defenders; CSA
- Notable aliases: Spider-Woman; Arachne; Madame Web
- Abilities: Spider-physiology granting: Superhuman strength, speed, agility, stamina, and durability; Wall-crawling; Ability to create webs out of psychokinetic energy; Regenerative healing factor; Clairvoyance; Precognition; Telepathy

Julia Carpenter is a superhero appearing in American comic books published by Marvel Comics. Created by Jim Shooter and Mike Zeck, the character first appeared in Secret Wars #6 (October 1984). Julia Carpenter was known as the second Spider-Woman, later as the second Arachne, and then as the second Madame Web.

Julia Carpenter as Spider-Woman appears in Spider-Man: Across the Spider-Verse (2023), and the Sony's Spider-Man Universe (SSU) film Madame Web (2024) under her maiden name Julia Cornwall, portrayed by Sydney Sweeney.

== Publication history ==
As Spider-Woman, the character debuted in issue 6 of the first Secret Wars limited series in 1984. She was unknown to all the other characters and came from a suburb of Denver that was used to form the patchwork Battleworld. Since that series, she has appeared as a starring character in Avengers West Coast and Force Works as well as a supporting character in the third Spider-Woman series, whose main character was Mattie Franklin. Julia starred in her own four-part Spider-Woman miniseries which explained her origin and the origin of her enemies, Death Web.

== Fictional character biography ==
A secretive government group called The Commission decided to create their own superhero. Val Cooper met college friend Julia Carpenter in Julia's hometown of Denver, and convinced her to be part of an "athletic study." She was unknowingly a test subject in their experiments. During the experiment, they "accidentally" injected Julia with a mix of spider venom and exotic plant extracts, which gave Julia powers very similar to those of Spider-Man.

Not long after she was given the identity of Spider-Woman, she was drawn into the first Secret Wars, where she met Spider-Man and the Avengers for the first time, and allied herself with the superhuman champions. She battled the Absorbing Man, Doctor Doom, and the Hulk. She was killed and resurrected by Doom with the power of the Beyonder. After returning to Earth, Julia joined Freedom Force (a government-sponsored super team made up primarily of former members of the Brotherhood of Evil Mutants who enlisted into government service to avoid prison terms). In an early mission with Freedom Force, the team was sent to arrest the X-Men. During this conflict with the X-Men, Julia also began to question her teammates' exceedingly brutal attitudes that they held over from their criminal pasts. Subsequently, Freedom Force was sent to arrest the Avengers after a disgruntled Quicksilver made false accusations against them. Freedom Force actually defeated the combined East and West Coast Avengers teams and helped bring the Avengers into custody at the Vault without a trial. Spider-Woman once again found her loyalties divided; she had a change of heart and eventually chose to break into the Vault and freeing them, battling the Guardsmen and thus becoming a fugitive from the law herself. Alongside Spider-Man, she battled the Wrecking Crew as a government assignment. In another adventure she teamed with Iron Man to battle renegade A.I.M. agents named the Seekers, who sought to capture Valerie Cooper doing undercover solo work. In gratitude for her earlier assistance with the Avengers, Iron Man worked with the government to get her pardoned.

Later, one of her assignments led her to California looking for a team of Asian supervillains called the Pacific Overlords. She met and assisted the Avengers West Coast against the Pacific Overlords and battled U.S. Agent. She was eventually offered membership, joining the Avengers West Coast. In addition while still a member of the West Coast Avengers, Julia was chosen by Doctor Strange to be a founding member of the Secret Defenders in their first mission alongside Darkhawk (whom she would later recommend for West Coast Avengers membership), Wolverine and Nomad. When the West Coast Avengers disbanded, Julia joined their spin-off team Force Works. She had a relationship with Moonraker during this time.

Julia's main enemies in her solo appearances were the arachnid-based team called Death Web, which consisted of three supervillains who were created by The Commission, using a variation of the same serum which transformed Julia. When Mike Clemson, founder of Death Web, captured Spider-Woman's daughter Rachel, he blackmailed her into fighting Spider-Man. Even though she nearly killed Spider-Man, she would not commit an act of murder, and Spider-Man helped her rescue Rachel. Eventually, Julia walked away from the superhero business to concentrate on raising her daughter. Like Jessica Drew (the original Spider-Woman), Julia was attacked by Charlotte Witter and had her powers stolen. After the loss of her superpowers, Julia returned to the life of a normal mother.

=== Civil War ===
Julia Carpenter in her Arachne costume. Interior artwork from Civil War: The Initiative 1 (March 2007 Marvel Comics) Art by Marc Silvestri

Julia reappeared in a story arc of the 2006 Ms. Marvel series, using the codename Arachne (which she intended to use). Her powers have clearly been restored. During Civil War, Julia registers under the Superhuman Registration Act, and she and Wonder Man aid Ms. Marvel in the training of novice superheroes.

Julia is shown to be a double agent; when she first responded to Iron Man's request, she thought it would be an opportunity to help people escape registration; she is shown to have tipped off Hobie Brown, the Prowler, moments before a S.H.I.E.L.D. capekiller squadron arrived at his home to arrest him, and she is thought to have warned many more heroes of impending arrests. It is also revealed that she is romantically involved with the Shroud, an opponent of the Superhuman Registration Act.

Julia's status is discovered when a captured Prowler reveals under interrogation that she tipped him off. The Shroud, who had been captured by Ms. Marvel, reveals that Julia was paralyzed for several months after she lost her powers, even though all of her other injuries had healed. The Shroud's company had synthesized a duplicate of the serum that provided Julia with her powers, and these returned several days after it was administered to her. With the Shroud's help, Julia underwent intense physical therapy and was soon able to walk again. It was during this time that she and the Shroud fell in love.

A government strike team led by Ms. Marvel, including Wonder Man and Araña, attacks Julia at her home just as she was about to flee the country with her daughter. Julia is captured and summarily incarcerated. It is revealed in Ms. Marvel #13 that Julia escaped captivity during the Negative Zone prison break, and she returned to Colorado in search of Rachel. A S.H.I.E.L.D. Psy Ops team telepathically traces her to Brooklyn, where she furiously confronts and attacks Araña, demanding to know where her daughter has been taken. She is subsequently defeated by Araña with surprising ease due to her instability from losing her daughter. After being rendered unconscious by Araña, she awakens aboard the Minicarrier 13 where Ms. Marvel endeavors to help Julia find Rachel.

=== Omega Flight ===
Arachne became a member of the new Canada-based team Omega Flight and was given the option of having outstanding charges dropped in exchange for her participation on the team. After a battle against the Wrecking Crew, Julia decided to stay on the team.

=== The Gauntlet/Grim Hunt ===
Afterward, Julia (still calling herself Arachne) became a victim of a grudge match between Spider-Man and the Kraven family. After escaping with Spider-Man from Ana and Alyosha Kravinoff, they are confronted by the Chameleon disguised as Ezekiel Sims, who informs them of a battle between the Spider and Hunter tribes. Julia is then captured by the Kravinoffs, along with Anya Corazon and Madame Web as Kaine (who was dressed as Spider-Man) is sacrificed to resurrect Kraven the Hunter. When Madame Web was mortally wounded by Sasha Kravinoff, she transferred her prophetic powers (and blindness) to Julia, to become the new Madame Web. Julia's first action in this role is to prevent Peter from killing Kraven, explaining to Peter that he is the center of a moral web that would be destroyed if he killed Kraven, advising him that this murder, however justified, would turn him into a ruthless destroyer. After burying Kaine and Madame Web in a potter's field, she explains her new purpose to Spider-Man and Araña before teleporting away.

=== Spider-Island ===
When the population of Manhattan develops spider-powers during the Spider-Island storyline, Julia observes the crisis with Shang-Chi, preventing him from intervening until Spider-Man is accidentally attacked by the New Avengers when he tries to help out. Later, as Anti-Venom works on curing the individuals affected of their spider-powers, reflects on the need for both Venom and Anti-Venom to fix the Spider-Island problem, but also notes that for one of them, "your story ends here." At the conclusion of the crisis, she offers the spider-powers cure to Spider-Man himself, but he rejects it. As she departs, she apologizes for the suffering that is to come.

While taking her daughter Rachel to summer school, Julia gets a vision telling her that the Great Web is unraveling. She then changes into her Madame Web gear and leaves to go speak to Spider-Man. While Spider-Man is fighting Morbius, the Living Vampire, Madame Web visits Spider-Man telling him that his life is in great danger. Although Spider-Man is concerned about Morbius, Madame Web states that Morbius is not the problem. She tells Spider-Man to return to Horizon Labs for a great tragedy lies in his future. She even tells Spider-Man that Silver Sable did not perish in the fight at Doctor Octopus' underwater hideout. Julia later detected that a new spider-based character has connected to the Web of Life as it shows that former Hobgoblin Roderick Kingsley was now working as Devil Spider.

After having a particularly strong vision of the future of the Marvel Universe, Julia enters a comatose state.

=== Spider-Verse ===
In the finale of the Spider-Verse storyline, Julia wakes out of her coma, and distresses over the Great Web's strands being severed by the Superior Spider-Man (Doctor Octopus' mind in Peter Parker's body) in a desperate attempt to alter his fate and prevent Peter Parker from returning. Though his attempt was thwarted, the damage caused to the Great Web had weakened every Spider's spider-sense and robbed Julia of her precognition.

== Characteristics ==
=== Powers and abilities ===
Spider-Woman possesses superhuman strength, speed, stamina, agility, and reflexes. She also possesses the ability to spin a "psi-web" of psionic energy between two surfaces. This web, once solidified, possesses sufficient tensile strength to support a 10-ton weight. It remains in effect for up to approximately 1 hour. She can also project and release sufficient psionic energy through her hands and feet to enable her to walk on walls and ceilings.

Julia's powers required considerable concentration for her to manifest them, and she found that physical gesturing aids her in the weaving of her psionic webs. By using psychokinetic energy, Spider-Woman can bind ambient free-floating molecules into strands of solid force. Her psi-webs can be used to wrap enemies, or focused into narrow web-lines that she can swing from. Due to their psychic nature, her psi-webs can form from a distance, and she can mentally control the movement of her webbing.

In addition to her natural superhuman advantages, she has been extensively trained by the Commission on Superhuman Activities in espionage and hand-to-hand combat. Although she lost her powers at one time, she regained them through a duplicate serum. She has heightened senses, and feels vibrations as does a spider in its web. Her senses allow her to detect a hollow area under a solid steel floor by walking over it.

In addition to her own powers, Julia now possesses the powers of Madame Web, including telepathy, clairvoyance, precognition, and the ability to sense the presence of psionic powers in others. However, she has lost her eyesight in the process of gaining these new powers. Despite her blindness, she is able to stalemate Spider-Man (with his new training in martial arts taught to him by Shang Chi, but lacking his Spider-Sense) using her clairvoyance in battle.

=== Costume ===
When, in the Secret Wars storyline, Spider-Man first laid eyes on the symbiote black costume that would eventually become the symbiote-charged villain known as Venom, he surmised that he had subconsciously redesigned his costume to look more like Julia's. During her brief tenure with Omega Flight, Julia began wearing a redesigned costume similar to her original one. After gaining Madame Web's mental powers, she passed her Arachne costume on to Anya Corazon, who then goes on to wear it as Spider-Girl.

== Reception ==
=== Accolades ===
- In 2012, IGN ranked Julia Carpenter 47th in their "Top 50 Avengers" list.
- In 2015, Entertainment Weekly ranked Julia Carpenter 57th in their "Let's rank every Avenger ever" list.
- In 2017, Screen Rant ranked Julia Carpenter 10th in their "Every Member Of The Spider-Man Family" list.
- In 2017, Gizmodo ranked Julia Carpenter 6th in their "Greatest Spider-Women of All Time" list.
- In 2020, Scary Mommy included Julia Carpenter in their "Looking For A Role Model? These 195+ Marvel Female Characters Are Truly Heroic" list.

== Other versions ==
In the X-Men Forever comics, Julia is Spider-Woman in her classic black-and-white costume, and a core member of the Avengers. However, she displays the powers of Jessica Drew as she is able to fire venom-blasts at Gambit when the X-Men are ordered to be arrested. She is also able to fly by unknown means as she does not have the glider-webs Jessica Drew uses to glide.

In a possible future, Julia is seen wearing a modified version of her original costume, with belts and straps and silver duplicates of the Black Widow's gauntlets. She is a member of a superhero team whose members include Punisher, Daredevil, and Rhino.

A monstrous spider-like version of Arachne originates from a dark reality where Death has no power called the Cancerverse, and is killed by Ronan the Accuser when she attempts to invade the Earth-616 reality.

=== Ultimate Marvel ===
The Ultimate Marvel equivalent of Spider-Woman posed as Julia Carpenter for a time.

=== MC2 ===
Julia exists in the alternate future of Earth-982. She has retired as Spider-Woman, and seeks Peter Parker's aid in order to convince Jessica Drew's child, Gerry Drew to halt his identity as Spider-Man, due to his terminal illness.

== In other media ==
=== Television ===
Julia Carpenter / Spider-Woman as she appears in Iron Man.

- Julia Carpenter as Spider-Woman appears in Iron Man, voiced by Casey DeFranco in the first season and Jennifer Hale in the second season. This version is a member of Force Works and executive at Stark Industries who competes with the Scarlet Witch for Tony Stark's affection, though he initially does not appear to reciprocate either of their feelings. He later attempts to pursue a relationship with Carpenter, but his "lone wolf" attitude complicates matters. Despite this, she remains loyal to Stark, especially after he faked his death and caused Force Works to disband as she and James Rhodes were the only ones who knew the truth. Stark realizes his feelings for Carpenter after she gets lost in a time portal, and once she is saved, they share a kiss.
- Julia Carpenter as Madame Web appears in Ultimate Spider-Man, voiced by Cree Summer. This version is a S.H.I.E.L.D. agent who uses her link to the web of reality to predict the future for Nick Fury.

=== Film ===
- Julia Carpenter as Spider-Woman makes a non-speaking cameo appearance in Spider-Man: Across the Spider-Verse as a member of Miguel O'Hara's Spider-Society.
- A teenage Julia Cornwall appears in Madame Web, portrayed by Sydney Sweeney. This version lives with her father and stepmother and is estranged from her mother. After being targeted by Ezekiel Sims, whose prophetic visions lead him to believe she might kill him in the future, Cornwall is rescued by Cassie Webb, who eventually trains her in becoming a superhero.

=== Video games ===
- Julia Carpenter's Spider-Woman costume appears as an alternate costume for Jessica Drew in Marvel Ultimate Alliance.
- An amalgamated incarnation of Julia Carpenter appears as an unlockable playable character in Marvel Super Hero Squad Online. This version dresses as Spider-Woman, but is identified as Arachne.
- Julia Carpenter as Arachne appears as a team-up character in Marvel Heroes, voiced by Colleen O'Shaughnessey.
- Julia Carpenter as Arachne appears in Marvel War of Heroes.
- Julia Carpenter as Spider-Woman and Madame Web appears as separate unlockable playable characters in Spider-Man Unlimited.

== Collected editions ==
Title	Material collected	Publication date	ISBN
Spider-Woman: Deathweb	Spider-Woman (vol. 2) #1–4 ("Deathweb, Be Not Proud", "You Can't Go Home Again (Especially If You Weren't Really There the First Time!)", "Avenger on the Amazon", and "Tangled Web")	1994	
Spider-Woman/Avengers: The Death of Mockingbird	Avengers West Coast #92–100, 102; Spider-Woman (vol. 2) #1–4; material from Marvel Comics Presents (1988) #143-144	1994	978-0785196891
Spider-Woman: Force Works	Force Works #1–15, Force Works: Ashcan Edition; Century: Distant Sons #1; material from Iron Man/Force Works Collectors' Preview	May 2016	978-1302900564
Marvel-Verse: Spider-Man & Madame Web	Marvel-Verse: Spider-Man & Madame Web (vol. 1)	2024	
