= Monsieur Aznavour =

- Theatrical release poster
- Directed by: Mehdi Idir; Grand Corps Malade
- Screenplay by: Mehdi Idir; Grand Corps Malade
- Produced by: Jean-Rachid Kallouche; Arnaud Chautard; Éric Altmayer; Nicolas Altmayer
- Starring: Tahar Rahim; Bastien Bouillon; Marie-Julie Baup
- Cinematography: Brecht Goyvaerts
- Edited by: Laure Gardette
- Production companies: Mandarin et Compagnie; Kallouche Cinéma; Pathé; TF1 Films Production; Beside Productions; Logical Content Ventures
- Distributed by: Pathé
- Release date: 23 October 2024
- Running time: 133 minutes
- Countries: France; Belgium
- Language: French
- Budget: €26 million; (US$28 million)
- Box office: $16.1 million

Monsieur Aznavour is a 2024 musical biographical drama film written and directed by Mehdi Idir and Grand Corps Malade. It is about the life of French singer Charles Aznavour, portrayed by Tahar Rahim, from his beginning as the son of Armenian immigrants to the rise of his career as a singer and actor which cemented his status as a beloved figure in France. The film was produced by Jean-Rachid Kallouche, who is married to Aznavour's daughter Katia. It is an international co-production between France and Belgium. It was theatrically released in France by Pathé on 23 October 2024.

== Cast ==
- Tahar Rahim as Charles Aznavour
- Bastien Bouillon as Pierre Roche
- Marie-Julie Baup as Édith Piaf
- Camille Moutawakil as Aïda Aznavour
- Ella Pellegrini as Micheline Rugel
- Hovnatan Avédikian as Misha Aznavourian
- Julien Campani
- Gulia Avetisyan as Mélinée Manouchian
- Lionel Cecilio as Gilbert Bécaud
- Petra Silander as Ulla Thorsell
- Sharon Mann as the interpreter
- Rupert Wynne-James as Frank Sinatra
- Tiffany Hofstetter as Kimberly
- Elisabeth Duda as Jeanne
- Anaïs Spinelli-Herry as Clarisse
- Tigran Mekhitarian as Missak Manouchian
- Nariné Grigoryan as Knar Baghdasarian
- Victor Meutelet as Johnny Hallyday

== Reception ==
=== Critical response ===
On AlloCiné, the film received an average rating of 3.2 out of 5, based on 37 reviews from French critics.

=== Accolades ===
Award	Date of ceremony	Category	Recipient(s)	Result	Ref.
César Awards	28 February 2025	Best Actor	Tahar Rahim	Nominated	
César Awards	28 February 2025	Best Costume Design	Isabelle Mathieu	Nominated	
César Awards	28 February 2025	Best Production Design	Stéphane Rozenbaum	Nominated	
César Awards	28 February 2025	Best Visual Effects	Stéphane Dittoo	Nominated	
