= Tahar Rahim =

French actor (born 1981)

- طاهر رحيم
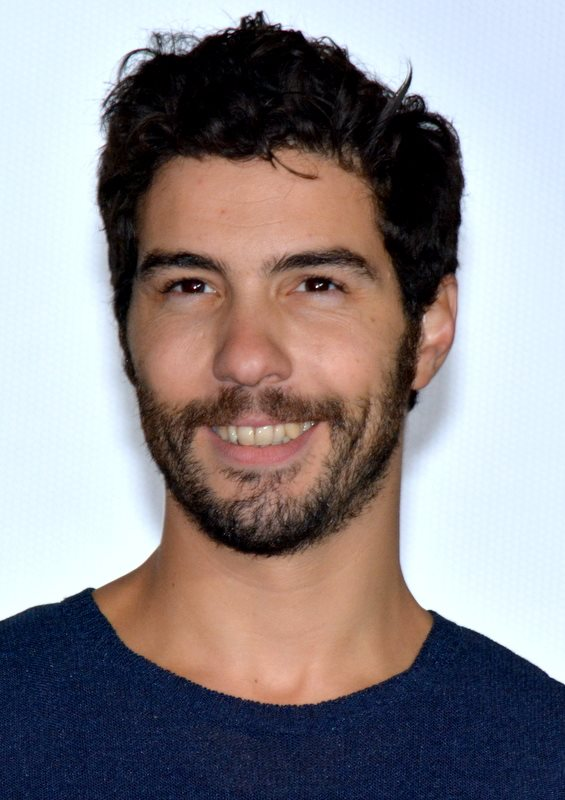
- Rahim in 2014
- Born: 4 July 1981 (age 45); Belfort, France
- Occupation: Actor
- Years active: 2005–present
- Spouse: Leïla Bekhti (m. 2010)
- Children: 4

Tahar Rahim (born 4 July 1981) is a French actor, most known for his performance in A Prophet (2009), for which he won the César Award for Best Actor and César Award for Best Male Revelation, alongside a BAFTA Rising Star Award nomination.

In Hollywood, Rahim first starred as FBI agent Ali Soufan in the miniseries The Looming Tower (2018). For his performance as Mohamedou Ould Slahi in The Mauritanian (2021) he received nominations for the Golden Globe Award for Best Actor and the BAFTA Award for Best Actor. For his portrayal of French serial killer Charles Sobhraj in the miniseries The Serpent (2021), Rahim received his second Golden Globe nomination.

He also portrayed Paul Barras in the period film Napoleon (2023), and Ezekiel Sims in the Sony Spider-Man Universe film Madame Web (2024). For his performance as Charles Aznavour in the musical biographical drama Monsieur Aznavour (2024), he received his third César nomination.

== Early life ==
Rahim was born in Belfort, France, to a family from Oran, Algeria.

After earning a Baccalauréat at the Lycée Condorcet of Belfort, Rahim enrolled first in sports and then computer science programmes. After two subsequent years of boredom studying the subjects in Strasbourg and Marseille, Rahim decided to pursue his passion and began to study film at the Paul Valéry University of Montpellier. His life as a film student was chronicled in a docufiction by fellow Belfortain Cyril Mennegun titled "Tahar, student", aired on French TV channel France 5 in 2006.

Following this, Rahim moved to Paris in 2005 and studied drama at the Laboratoire de l'Acteur under Hélène Zidi-Chéruy while working in a factory during the week, and in a nightclub at weekends, to make ends meet.

== Career ==
In mid-2006, after signing with an agent, Rahim won a part in the hit Canal+ television series La Commune written by Abdel Raouf Dafri.

After a two-line appearance in the 2007 horror movie Inside starring Béatrice Dalle, he went through a gruelling three months of auditioning. After eight callbacks, he landed his breakthrough role.

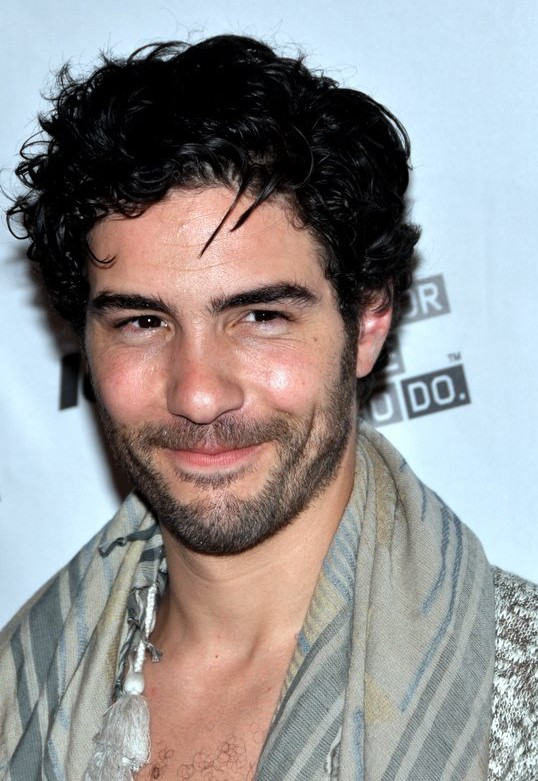
Rahim in 2012

Rahim also starred in Chinese director Lou Ye's film Love and Bruises. The controversial director had twice been banned by the Chinese government from making movies. The director likely met Rahim at the 2009 Cannes Film Festival, where they were presenting Spring Fever and A Prophet, respectively. Love and Bruises is the adaptation of the banned biography of Jie Liu Falin.

Rahim also starred in Free Men, the biopic about Si Kaddour Benghabrit, the French-Algerian diplomat founder of the Great Mosque of Paris, directed by Ismaël Ferroukhi of Le Grand Voyage fame.

In 2015, Rahim was selected to be on the jury for the Un Certain Regard section of the 2015 Cannes Film Festival. He later starred in the European crime drama television series The Last Panthers.

In 2018, he appeared as Judas in the film Mary Magdalene, written by Helen Edmundson. In the U.S. that year, he had a starring role as FBI agent Ali Soufan in The Looming Tower miniseries.

In 2021, he was nominated for a Golden Globe for portraying Mohamedou Ould Salahi in The Mauritanian, set among detainees at the US camp at Guantanamo. Rahim also served as a jury member at the 74th Cannes Film Festival.

Rahim played Paul Barras in Ridley Scott's Napoleon (2023), starring Joaquin Phoenix, for Apple TV+. He played Ezekiel Sims in Sony's Spider-Man Universe film Madame Web.

In 2023, Rahim was announced to be playing French singer Charles Aznavour in the biopic film Monsieur Aznavour. It premiered in late 2024, for his performance Rahim received his second César Award for Best Actor nomination.

In 2025, Rahim starred as Amin in Alpha by Julia Ducournau. For the role, Rahim lost 20 kilograms, creating a media uproar in France during the release of Monsieur Aznavour.

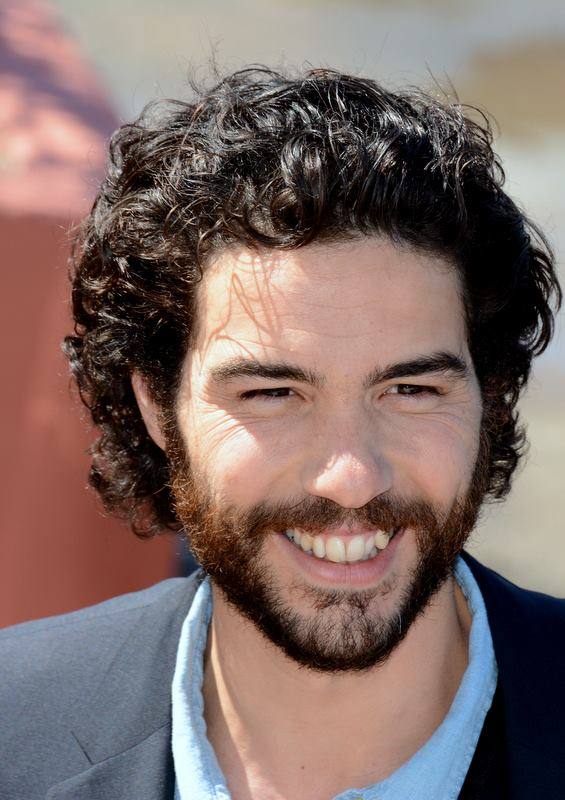
Rahim in 2013

== Personal life ==
Rahim is married to French actress Leïla Bekhti, whom he met while filming A Prophet in 2007. Together they have four children.

In June 2024, Rahim signed a petition alongside 230 French artists addressed to French President Emmanuel Macron demanding the France government to officially recognize the State of Palestine.

== Filmography ==
=== Film ===
Year	Title	Role	Notes
2006	Tahar l'étudiant	Tahar	Docufiction
2007	Inside	A policeman	
2009	A Prophet	Malik El Djebena	
2011	The Eagle	Prince of the Seal People	Lines in Pictish language
2011	Les Hommes libres	Younes	
2011	Love and Bruises	Mathieu	
2011	Black Gold	Prince Auda	
2012	Our Children	Mounir	
2013	The Past	Samir	
2013	Grand Central	Gary	
2013	The Informant	Redjani Belimane	
2014	The Cut	Nazaret Manoogian	
2014	Samba	Wilson	
2014	Le Père Noël	Père Noël	
2015	The Anarchists	Jean Albertini	
2016	Daguerrotype	Jean	Also known as The Woman in the Silver Plate
2016	Heal the Living	Thomas Rémige	
2017	The Price of Success	Brahim Mecheri	
2018	Mary Magdalene	Judas	
2018	Treat Me Like Fire	Abel	
2019	The Kindness of Strangers	Marc	
2021	The Mauritanian	Mohamedou Ould Salahi	
2022	Don Juan	Laurent	
2023	Napoleon	Paul Barras	
2024	Madame Web	Ezekiel Sims	
2024	Monsieur Aznavour	Charles Aznavour	
2025	Alpha	Amin	
2026	Les Misérables	Javert	Post-production

=== Television ===
Year	Title	Role	Notes
2007	La Commune	Yazid Fikry	8 episodes
2015	The Last Panthers	Khalil	6 episodes
2018	The Looming Tower	Ali Soufan	Miniseries; 10 episodes
2020	The Eddy	Farid	3 episodes
2021	The Serpent	Charles Sobhraj	Miniseries; 8 episodes
2023	Extrapolations	Omar Haddad; Ezra Haddad	3 episodes
2026	Prisoner	Tibor Stone	6 episodes

=== Theatre ===
- 2007 – 2008: Libres sont les papillons in the role of the blind character Benjamin. The play was an adaptation from its original English into French of Butterflies are free written by Leonard Gershe by Hélène Zidi-Chéruy who also directed and staged it at the Côté Court Theater, 11th arrondissement of Paris.

== Accolades ==
Award	Year	Nominated work	Category	Result	Ref.
British Academy Film Awards	2010	—	BAFTA Rising Star Award	Nominated	
British Academy Film Awards	2021	The Mauritanian	Best Actor in a Leading Role	Nominated	
César Awards	2010	A Prophet	Best Actor	Won	
César Awards	2010	A Prophet	Most Promising Actor	Won	
César Awards	2025	Monsieur Aznavour	Best Actor	Nominated	
Chicago Film Critics Association Awards	2010	A Prophet	Most Promising Performer	Nominated	
Chlotrudis Awards	2014	The Past	Best Supporting Actor	Nominated	
Dublin Film Critics' Circle Awards	2010	A Prophet	Best Actor	Won	
European Film Awards	2009	A Prophet	European Actor	Won	
European Film Awards	2021	The Mauritanian	European Actor	Nominated	
Globe de Cristal Awards	2010	A Prophet	Best Actor	Won	
Golden Globe Awards	2021	The Mauritanian	Best Actor in a Motion Picture – Drama	Nominated	
Golden Globe Awards	2022	The Serpent	Best Actor in a Limited Series, Anthology Series or Television Film	Nominated	
IFTA Film & Drama Awards	2011	A Prophet	Best International Actor	Nominated	
International Cinephile Society Awards	2011	A Prophet	Best Actor	Runner-up	
London Film Critics' Circle Awards	2010	A Prophet	Actor of the Year	Nominated	
London Film Critics' Circle Awards	2021	The Mauritanian	Actor of the Year	Nominated	
Lumière Awards	2010	A Prophet	Best Actor	Won	
Lumière Awards	2014	Grand Central	Best Actor	Nominated	
Prix Patrick Dewaere	2010	—	Honoree	Won	
Royal Television Society Programme Awards	2022	The Serpent	Best Male Actor	Nominated	
Santa Barbara International Film Festival Awards	2021	The Mauritanian	Virtuosos Award	Won	
