= Pierre Roche (musician) =

French composer

Pierre Roche (27 March 1919 – 29 January 2001) was a pianist, singer and composer, better known for his duo with Charles Aznavour (1943–1950). Roche and Aznavour met at a music hall and debuted on stage with their own songs in 1944. Edith Piaf noticed them and hired them for a tour in France with the Compagnons de la chanson. Charles Aznavour then decided to pursue a solo career in order to expand his repertoire, while his pianist settled in Quebec. In the 1970s, Aznavour invited Pierre Roche to join him on Olympia's stage to perform together.

== Biography ==
Born in Beauvais, in the north of France, Pierre Roche resided in Paris in 1942 when he met a young singer by the name of Varenagh Aznavourian. In 1947, Georges Ulmer won a Grand Prix with one of their songs, "J'ai bu". The duo recorded few 78 rpm discs which had some local success. Then they joined Edith Piaf in her tour. After a cold reception in New York they went to Montreal where they succeeded at the end of 1948 and decided to extend their stay in Canada. In May 1949, Charles Trenet recommended them to Gérard Thibault, the owner of fashionable cabaret Chez Gérard. Roche met young singer Jocelyne Deslongchamps, who would later be known as "Aglaé". She became his wife, and the duo Roche and Aznavour split up. After more than a decade of international tours, the couple settled permanently in Quebec in 1963.

Roche died of cancer in January 2001. He was portrayed by Bastien Bouillon in the 2024 biographical drama film Monsieur Aznavour.

== Discography ==
- Boule de gomme; Je suis amoureux, with Charles Aznavour – Quality P 042, 1948
- Le Feutre taupe; Départ Express, with Charles Aznavour – Polydor 560072, 1948
- J'ai bu; Voyez c'est le printemps, with Charles Aznavour – Polydor 560071, 1948
- Tant de monnaie; Je n'ai qu'un sou, with Charles Aznavour – Polydor 560077, 1949
- Les Cris de ma ville; Retour, with Charles Aznavour – Quality P004
- En revenant de Québec; Il pleut, with Charles Aznavour – London 25016
- Ma prairie fleurie; Les Filles de Trois-Rivières – Alouette CF 750
