= Ezekiel Sims =

Fictional Marvel Comics character

- Ezekiel Sims as depicted in The Amazing Spider-Man #33 (July 2001). Art by J. Scott Campbell and Tim Townsend.

Publication information
- Publisher: Marvel Comics
- First appearance: The Amazing Spider-Man #30 (June 2001)
- Created by: J. Michael Straczynski; John Romita Jr.

In-story information
- Team affiliations: The Spider-Society
- Notable aliases: Zeke
- Abilities: Powers

Ezekiel "Zeke" Sims is a character appearing in American comic books published by Marvel Comics, usually as a supporting character in stories featuring Spider-Man and Silk. Versions of the character from alternate timelines are also featured in the 2014 crossover event Spider-Verse.

Characters based on Ezekiel appear in the films Spider-Man: Across the Spider-Verse (2023), voiced by Mike Rianda, and the live-action Sony's Spider-Man Universe (SSU) film Madame Web (2024), portrayed by Tahar Rahim.

== Publication history ==
Ezekiel first appeared in The Amazing Spider-Man vol. 2 #30 (June 2001) and was created by J. Michael Straczynski and John Romita Jr.

== Fictional character biography ==
Ezekiel Sims is a rich businessman who, in his younger years, ritualistically gained powers similar to those of Spider-Man. He aspired to use his powers to be a hero, but instead used them to create and develop a corporation, realizing that he could not do anything without a base of operations. He swiftly became too busy to use his powers on a daily basis. When Spider-Man emerged, Ezekiel hired six independent and private detectives to investigate Spider-Man's life, allowing him to piece together who Spider-Man was from the various pieces of information they provided him.

Ezekiel, in his 50s, contacts Spider-Man to explain to him the nature of animal totems: people who gain supernatural abilities from a mystic link to certain animals. He suggests that the spider that bit Peter Parker was not mutated by the radiation, but actually trying to give Peter its powers before the radiation killed it. This means that Spider-Man is now part of the supernatural food chain, becoming a target for other totems and beings who feed on totems. It is also suggested that many of Spider-Man's foes are themed after animals because they sense Peter to be a true totem and are motivated to destroy him, as they are merely impostors. Ezekiel subsequently aids Spider-Man in battling Morlun, a vampire-like entity that 'fed' on totems, apparently at the cost of his life. It was later revealed that he survived and departed for Africa, where he aided Spider-Man in battling Shathra.

It is later revealed that the vast supernatural menaces that Spider-Man had faced were really after Ezekiel. In an attempt to direct the consequences of gaining his powers onto Spider-Man himself, Ezekiel takes Spider-Man to the temple where he had been given his powers and draws blood to attract a massive spider that would take the 'false' totem warrior as a sacrifice. However, Ezekiel realizes that he had done nothing with his powers but help himself, while Peter had selflessly risked his life to save others repeatedly. For this, he sacrifices himself by attacking the spider that would have eaten Peter.

In Grim Hunt, a reanimated Ezekiel (covered in spiders) appears before Spider-Man and Arachne. Unknown to Spider-Man, this Ezekiel is really the Chameleon in disguise, leading Spider-Man into a trap to carry out the resurrection of Sergei Kravinoff.

During the "Original Sin" storyline, it is revealed that the radioactive spider also bit Cindy Moon before dying. Ezekiel had educated Cindy to use her powers, but kept her locked in a bunker to keep her safe from Morlun. Years later, Spider-Man learns about Silk and frees her from Ezekiel's bunker, allowing her to start a new life and career. This ends up triggering the multiversal hunt of all spiders as the Inheritors are now aware of Silk's existence.

== Powers, abilities and traits ==
Ezekiel possesses a number of superhuman attributes that are almost identical to those naturally possessed by Spider-Man. His strength, speed, stamina, agility, reaction time, and resistance to physical injury are all enhanced to superhuman levels. Although Ezekiel is of an advanced age, none of his physical attributes have declined over the decades.

Ezekiel also possesses the ability to stick to most surfaces and crawl along them in the same way as Spider-Man: for this reason, he frequently goes barefoot, as it makes it more convenient for him to stick to walls. He also possesses a type of E.S.P. that serves as an early warning system in much the same way as Spider-Man's spider-sense, although his was not as developed as Spider-Man's. Because of their nearly identical powers, Ezekiel and Spider-Man are immune to each other's early warning system.

In addition to his powers, Ezekiel is extremely wealthy and is a highly skilled businessman and owner of a company with international connections. As with Spider-Man, he is a formidable hand-to-hand combatant though he has had no formal training. He uses a unique type of freestyle fighting that allows him to make full use of his powers. He does not seem to have any web-generating devices like Spider-Man's web-shooters, and is never seen to produce any webbing naturally. In his conversations with Peter Parker, the subject never comes up. He is knowledgeable of the mystical nature of totems, and once told Peter the legend of the first "Spider-Man".

== Other versions ==
=== Spider-Verse ===
During the "Spider-Verse" storyline, different versions of Ezekiel from alternate timelines are featured:

- One of the Spider-Men recruited to fight the Inheritors is the "Old Man Spider" of Earth-4, who wears a similar outfit to the Spider-Man of Earth-312500. (Note: As seen in The Amazing Spider-Man #500.) After being fatally injured by Daemos of the Inheritors, the "Old Man Spider-Man" is revealed to be an alternate Ezekiel who took up the Spider-Man identity after Morlun killed his version of Peter. Before dying, Ezekiel implores the Spider-Man of Earth-616 to protect "the Bride, the Other, and the Scion".
- The Earth-3145 version of Ezekiel approached Ben Parker (who had retired from being Spider-Man after Aunt May and Peter were killed by the Emerald Elf) and informed Ben about the imminent arrival of Morlun to kill him. With nothing left, Ben accepted Ezekiel's offer.

== In other media ==
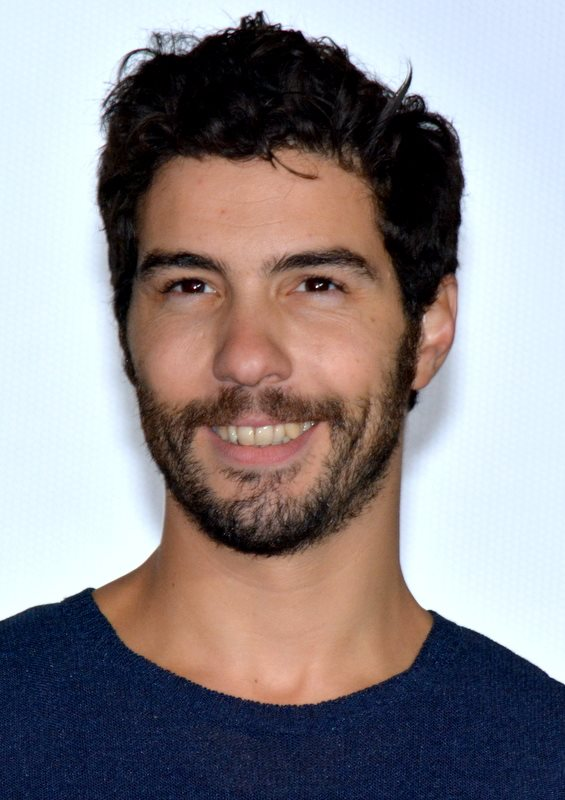
Tahar Rahim plays Ezekiel in Madame Web.

=== Film ===
- An alternate universe incarnation of Ezekiel Sims, also known as Spider-Therapist, appears in Spider-Man: Across the Spider-Verse (2023), voiced by Mike Rianda. This version is a therapist and grief counselor for Miguel O'Hara's Spider-Society who received his doctorate from Ditko University.
- Ezekiel Sims appears in Madame Web (2024), portrayed by Tahar Rahim. This version is an explorer and friend of Cassie Webb's late mother Constance. In flashbacks, he sought out a rare Peruvian spider with healing properties, during which he betrayed and killed Constance and acquired powers similar to Spider-Man, as well as the ability to poison individuals, and wears a black and red suit similar to Spider-Man's. In the present, after seeing visions that suggest one of three Spider-Women will kill him as a side effect of stealing the spider, he sets out to kill them first via stolen NSA technology. However, Cassie develops powers of her own, sets out to protect the Spider-Women, and eventually defeats and kills him by dropping a Pepsi sign on him. This incarnation of Ezekiel has been criticized online for lacking characterization and context for his motives. The noticeable use of ADR for much of his dialogue has also been noted negatively.

=== Video games ===
- Ezekiel Sims appears as an unlockable playable character in Spider-Man Unlimited.
- Ezekiel Sims appears in Marvel Snap.

== See also ==
- List of barefooters
