= S. J. Clarkson =

British television director

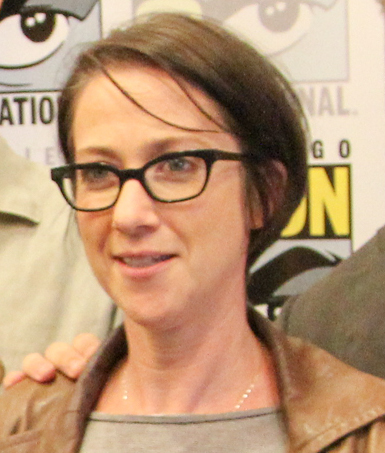
- Clarkson at the 2014 San Diego Comic-Con
- Born: United Kingdom
- Occupations: Film director, television director
- Years active: 1999–present

S. J. Clarkson is a British television and film director. She is known for directing Madame Web and co‑creating Mistresses.

== Early life and education ==
Clarkson studied at a New York film school after an early period in theatre, where she worked for producer Cameron Mackintosh.

== Career ==
Clarkson's credits include the series Doctors, Casualty, EastEnders, Footballers' Wives, and Life on Mars, as well as the American series Heroes, House, Dexter, Succession and Ugly Betty. In 2008, she co-created the British series Mistresses.

In 2019, a prequel show to Game of Thrones was announced for HBO with Clarkson attached to direct and executive produce the pilot, in addition to being involved in the creation of the series. The show, reportedly entitled Bloodmoon, took place 5,000 years before the main series and starred Naomi Watts in the lead role. The pilot had reportedly been shot, but the show was subsequently shelved at HBO in late 2019.

In film, Clarkson directed the Helena Bonham Carter-led film Toast, releasing on BBC One in 2010.

In 2024, Clarkson made her feature directorial debut with the Razzie winning Madame Web film adaptation, based on the Marvel Comics character of the same name, and starring Dakota Johnson and Sydney Sweeney.

In 2026, Clarkson directed one episode of the Apple TV series Cape Fear, starring Javier Bardem and Amy Adams and Executive Produced by Martin Scorsese and Steven Spielberg.

== Filmography ==
Film

Year	Title	Director	Writer	Executive producer
2024	Madame Web	Yes	Yes	Yes

Television

Year	Title	Director	Executive producer	Notes
2001–04	Doctors	Yes	No	37 episodes
2002	A Week in the West End	Yes	No	Also producer
2003–05	Casualty	Yes	No	5 episodes
2004	EastEnders	Yes	No	8 episodes
2005	Footballers' Wives	Yes	No	2 episodes
2005	Bad Girls	Yes	No	2 episodes
2006	Hustle	Yes	No	2 episodes
2006–07	Life on Mars	Yes	No	6 episodes
2008–10	Mistresses	Yes	No	2 episodes Also co-creator
2009	Whitechapel	Yes	No	3 episodes
2009–10	Heroes	Yes	No	3 episodes
2009–11	Dexter	Yes	No	3 episodes
2010	Ugly Betty	Yes	No	Episode "The Passion of the Betty"
2010	Toast	Yes	No	TV movie
2011	House	Yes	No	Episode "Recession Proof"
2012	Hunted	Yes	No	2 episodes
2013	Banshee	Yes	No	2 episodes
2013	Smash	Yes	No	Episode "The Surprise Party"
2013	Bates Motel	Yes	No	Episode "The Man in Number 9"
2013	The Bridge	Yes	No	Episode "All About Eva"
2013	Hostages	Yes	No	Episode "The Good Reason"
2014	Turn: Washington's Spies	Yes	No	Episode "Of Cabbages and Kings"
2014	Orange Is the New Black	Yes	No	Episode "40 Oz. of Furlough"
2015	Dig	Yes	No	Episode "Pilot"
2015	Jessica Jones	Yes	Yes	2 episodes
2016	Vinyl	Yes	No	Episode "The Racket"
2016	Love, Nina	Yes	Yes	5 episodes
2017	The Defenders	Yes	Yes	2 episodes
2018	Collateral	Yes	Yes	Miniseries
2018	Succession	Yes	No	Episode: "Prague"
2021	Made for Love	No	Yes	10 episodes
2022	Anatomy of a Scandal	Yes	Yes	Miniseries
2026	Cape Fear	Yes	No	1 episode
