= Madame Web =

Marvel Comics fictional character

- Artwork from The Sensational Spider-Man #26 (July 2006). Art by Clayton Crain.

Publication information
- Publisher: Marvel Comics
- First appearance: The Amazing Spider-Man #210 (November 1980)
- Created by: Dennis O'Neil; John Romita Jr.

In-story information
- Alter ego: Cassandra Webb
- Species: Human mutant
- Place of origin: Salem, Oregon
- Abilities: Clairvoyance; Precognition; Telepathy; Gifted intellect

Madame Web (Cassandra Webb) is a character appearing in American comic books published by Marvel Comics. She first appeared in The Amazing Spider-Man No. 210, published November 1980, and was created by writer Dennis O'Neil and artist John Romita Jr. She is usually depicted as a supporting character in the Spider-Man comic book series, where she appears as an elderly woman with myasthenia gravis, connected to a life support system resembling a spiderweb.

Madame Web is a clairvoyant and precognitive mutant who first appears to help Spider-Man find a kidnapping victim. She is one of the mutants who did not lose their powers during the "Decimation" storyline. In "Grim Hunt", she is attacked by Ana Kravinoff and her mother Sasha, who kills her, but before she dies she is able to pass her powers of precognition as well as her blindness on to Julia Carpenter, who becomes the next Madame Web. Webb is subsequently resurrected by Ben Reilly before succumbing to the Carrion Virus. Webb is the grandmother of the fourth Spider-Woman, Charlotte Witter.

Madame Web has appeared in or served as inspiration for several Spider-Man related media. Dakota Johnson portrayed Cassandra "Cassie" Webb in the eponymous 2024 film.

== Publication history ==
Madame Web was created by writer Dennis O'Neil and artist John Romita Jr., and first appeared in The Amazing Spider-Man No. 210 (November 1980).

== Fictional character biography ==
Born in Salem, Oregon, Cassandra Webb is a paralyzed, blind, telepathic, clairvoyant, and precognitive mutant who works as a professional medium. After being stricken with myasthenia gravis, she is connected to a life support system designed by her husband Jonathan, which includes a series of tubes shaped like a spider-web.

Spider-Man approaches her while looking for kidnapped Daily Globe publisher K.J. Clayton (actually an impersonator fronting for Clayton's circulation manager Rupert Dockery, the kidnapping's mastermind). Madame Web uses her powers to help him locate and rescue both the real and the fake Clayton. She later discloses to him that she already knows his secret identity.

In the "Nothing Can Stop the Juggernaut!" story arc, she contacts Spider-Man for assistance when Black Tom Cassidy dispatches the Juggernaut to capture her, hoping to exploit her psychic abilities against the X-Men. She nearly dies after Juggernaut separates her from her life-support system. This triggers a fight between Spider-Man and the Juggernaut, who is subsequently trapped in a construction site's wet cement foundation. The resulting mental trauma, however, means that Madame Web apparently loses her memory of Spider-Man's secret identity.

Webb is the maternal grandmother of the fourth Spider-Woman, Charlotte Witter. She participates in an arcane ritual known as the "Gathering of the Five" to gain both immortality and eternal youth. Restored to her physical prime, Webb serves as a mentor of sorts to the third Spider-Woman, the young Mattie Franklin.

Madame Web resurfaces, with her psychic powers intact, after Decimation. However, since House of M (in which she appears young), Cassandra seemingly loses her mystical enhancements and reverts to her aged self, though her myasthenia gravis remains gone. (Note: As of Sensational Spider-Man No. 26 (Part 4 of "Feral").)

Madame Web again returns in a back-up feature in The Amazing Spider-Man #600. She looks into the future, showing what are apparently quick looks into Spider-Man's future, only to see someone "unravelling the web of fate," and fearfully exclaiming "They're hunting spiders." After that, she is attacked by Ana Kravinoff and her mother Sasha. The pair incapacitate her and then claim "we now have our eyes." She is seen still held captive by Ana and her mother, as they inspect their new quarry, Mattie Franklin. While still bound in a chair, she apologizes to a then-unconscious Mattie, who is later killed by Sasha Kravinoff as part of a sacrificial ritual that revives Grim Hunter.

At the conclusion of "Grim Hunt", Sasha Kravinoff slashes the throat of Madame Web, believing that Web was deceiving her and knew the outcome of events that transpired. Before dying, Web reveals that she is no longer blind, and transfers her psychic powers to Julia Carpenter.

During the Dead No More: The Clone Conspiracy storyline, Madame Web is resurrected by Ben Reilly (posing as the Jackal), inserting her soul into a cloned body. Julia Carpenter senses that Madame Web is alive from telepathic feedback resulting from Electro's attack. Julia infiltrates New U Technologies and uses the opportunity to investigate the near-abandoned facility. During this time, Julia is led to Madame Web, who refuses to take medication which could aid her in healing from Electro's attack. Madame Web has seen the future and refuses to be a part of it. Before dying from clone degeneration, Madame Web tells Julia to save Prowler.

== Characteristics ==
=== Powers and abilities ===
Madame Web is a mutant who possesses several psychic abilities. She can use telepathy to read the minds of others. She has the ability to see the future. Madame Web can project an astral form of herself away from her physical body. She can perform psychic surgery on the minds of others. She is sensitive to psychic energies, allowing her to sense the presence of psionic powers in others, to see the area surrounding her, and events which take place far away from her. Additionally, Madame Web has a gifted intellect.

=== Condition ===
When dying, she displayed the ability to transfer her mutation to another individual, such as Julia Carpenter. Madame Web was a victim of myasthenia gravis, a disorder of neuromuscular junction transmission. As a result, she became entirely dependent on external life support for survival. This is no longer the case as she was cured of the condition some time ago. She is also blind and relies on her powers to compensate. Madame Web is cybernetically linked to a spider-web-like life-support chair which attends to all of her bodily needs.

== Reception ==
=== Accolades ===
- In 2017, Screen Rant ranked Madame Web 12th in their "Every Member Of The Spider-Man Family" list.

== Other versions ==
Many alternate universe versions of Madame Web have appeared throughout the character's publication history.

=== Avataars: Covenant of the Shield ===
An alternate universe version of Madame Web appears in Avataars: Covenant of the Shield. This version is the Widow of the Web, a spider-goddess who grants Webswinger his powers.

=== House of M ===
Cassandra Webb appears in House of M as a therapist employed by S.H.I.E.L.D.

=== Ultimate Marvel ===
Madame Web appears in Ultimate Spider-Man as part of the psych team that plans to change Spider-Woman's memories.

== In other media ==
=== Television ===
Madame Web as depicted in Spider-Man: The Animated Series

- The Cassandra Webb incarnation of Madame Web appears in Spider-Man: The Animated Series, voiced by Joan Lee. This version is an ally of the Beyonder with similar powers over reality who is tasked with testing Spider-Men from across the multiverse to determine whether they can stop Spider-Carnage from destroying the multiverse. Seeing leadership potential in the "prime" Spider-Man, Madame Web tests him throughout the third season, Sins of the Father, though she respects his wish to not see her again until the time comes for his final test. After Spider-Man wins the Secret Wars during the fifth season, Madame Web and the Beyonder task him with leading a group of multiversal Spider-Men to fight Spider-Carnage in the two-part series finale "Spider-Wars". Following the villain's defeat, Madame Web rewards Spider-Man by taking him to visit Stan Lee and helping him find his girlfriend Mary Jane Watson.
- The Julia Carpenter incarnation of Madame Web appears in Ultimate Spider-Man, voiced by Cree Summer.

=== Film ===
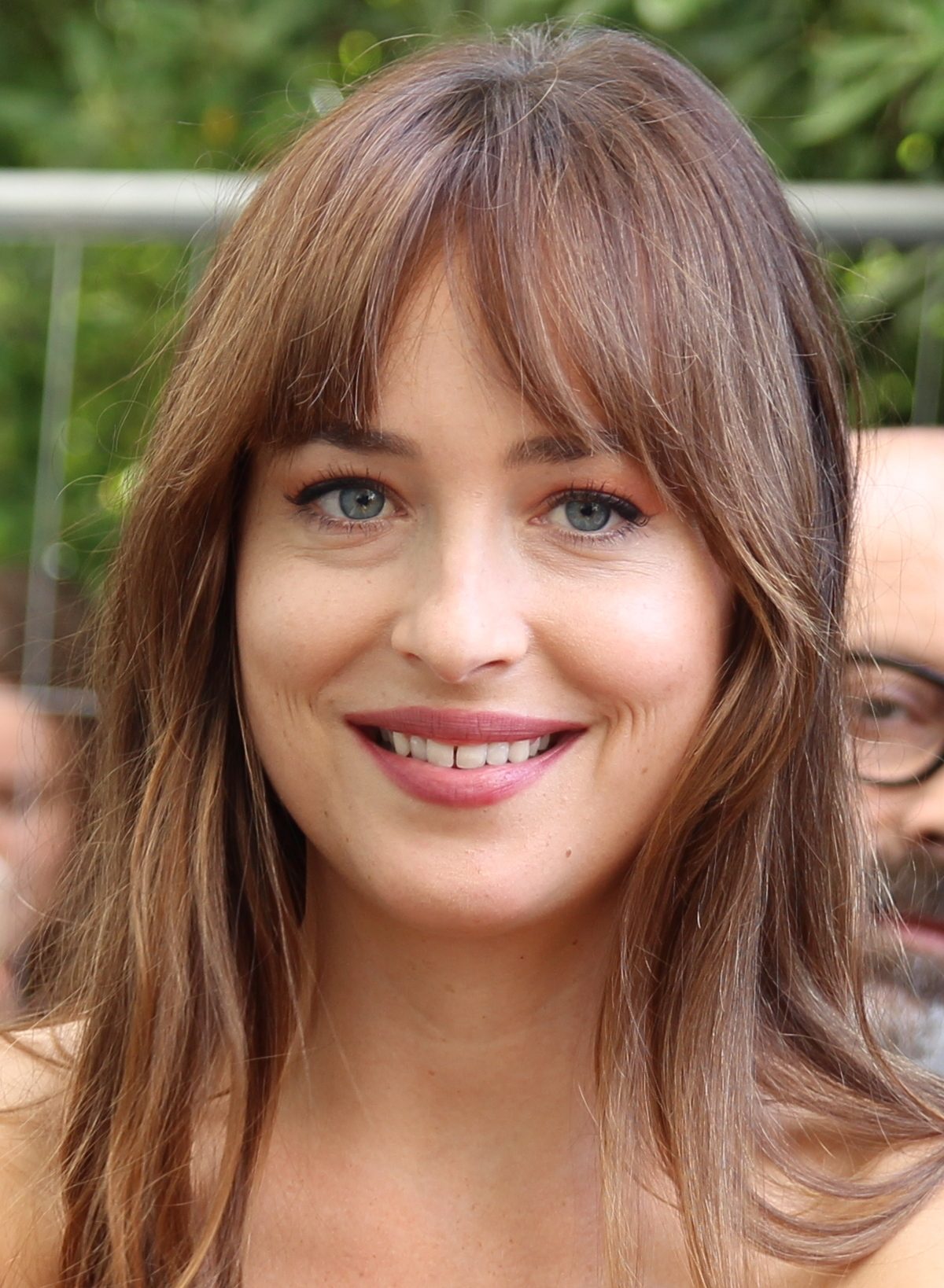
Dakota Johnson, who portrays Madame Web in her self-titled film

- A young Cassandra "Cassie" Webb / Madame Web appears in a self-titled film, portrayed by Dakota Johnson. This version is a paramedic partnered with her friend Ben Parker who acquired her powers after her pregnant mother Constance Webb was betrayed and left for dead by Ezekiel Sims. After being rescued by natives, she was bitten by a rare Peruvian spider they were looking for shortly before giving birth to Cassie. Julia Carpenter also appears, portrayed by Sydney Sweeney. Over the course of the film, Cassie works to protect Carpenter, Mattie Franklin, and Anya Corazon from Sims. Despite being blinded and paralyzed while defeating him, Cassie becomes the trio's mentor.

=== Video games ===
- The Cassandra Webb incarnation of Madame Web appears in Questprobe featuring Spider-Man.
- The Cassandra Webb incarnation of Madame Web appears in Spider-Man: Shattered Dimensions, voiced by Susanne Blakeslee. After Spider-Man accidentally breaks the Tablet of Order and Chaos while fighting Mysterio, she informs him of its mystical properties and tasks him, Spider-Man Noir, Spider-Man 2099, and a black-suited version of the Ultimate Spider-Man to retrieve its pieces in their respective universes before supervillains find them. Additionally, she provides instructions to the Spider-Men about their powers and grants them new ones so they can complete their mission more easily. However, Mysterio takes her hostage after discovering a fragment he stole granted him magical powers and demands the Spider-Men give him the rest. Once the tablet is reassembled, Mysterio becomes a god-like being and attempts to alter reality to his liking, but Madame Web is able to bring the four Spider-Men together so they can defeat Mysterio and separate him from the Tablet. Afterward, she sends everyone back to their respective native universes.
