= List of cameo appearances by Stan Lee =

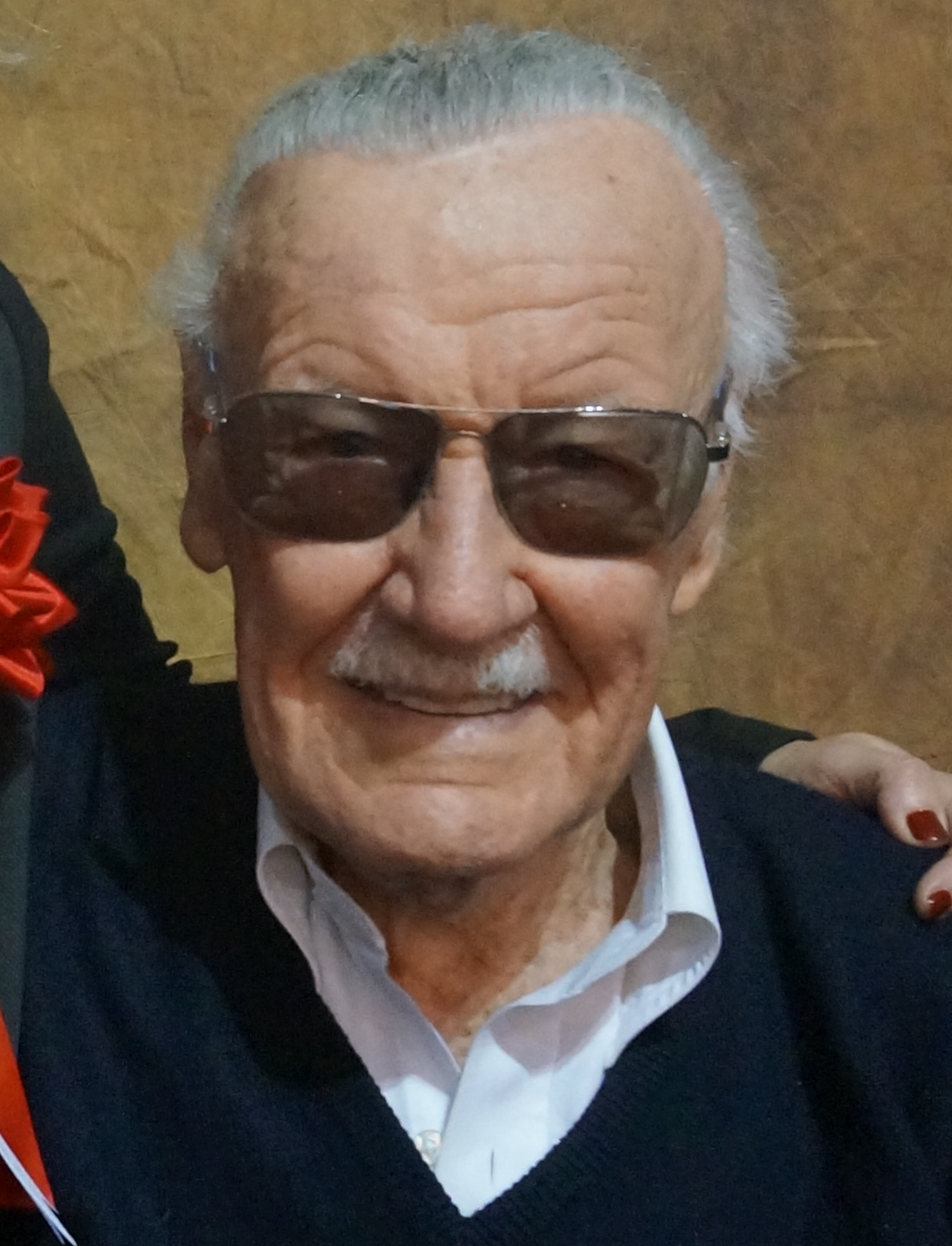
Lee at Tokyo Comic-Con in 2016

The following is a list of cameo appearances by Stan Lee (1922–2018) in Marvel Comics films, television shows and video games. A prolific comic book writer, editor, publisher, and producer, Lee has also had numerous cameos in non-Marvel media.

== Marvel appearances ==
=== Marvel Cinematic Universe ===
In the Marvel Cinematic Universe, Stan Lee portrayed himself as an informant for the Watchers, keeping watch and detailing events that take place on Earth. Lee appeared in each installment of the franchise from Iron Man (2008) to Avengers: Endgame (2019), prior to his death. According to Joe Russo, Lee's cameos were filmed consecutively with cameos already filmed for releases in 2019.

==== Films ====
- In Iron Man (2008), Lee, credited as "Himself", appears at a gala cavorting with three blondes, where Tony Stark mistakes him for Hugh Hefner. In the theatrical release of the film, Stark simply greets Lee as "Hef" and moves on; another version of the scene was filmed where Stark realizes his mistake, but Lee graciously responds, "That's okay, I get this all the time." In 2008, Stan Lee named this as his favorite cameo appearance to that date.
- In The Incredible Hulk (2008), Lee appears as a hapless citizen who accidentally ingests a soft drink contaminated with Bruce Banner's blood. He subsequently drops it and falls ill to gamma radiation sickness, leading to the discovery of Banner's location in a bottling plant in Brazil. A character in the film is also named after him: Stanley Lieber, who owns Stanley's Pizza Parlor.
- In Iron Man 2 (2010), during the Stark Expo, Lee, wearing suspenders and a red shirt and black and purple tie, is mistakenly greeted by Tony Stark as "Larry King".
- In Thor (2011), Lee appears among many people at the site where Thor's hammer Mjolnir lands on Earth. He tears the bed off his pickup truck in an attempt to pull Mjolnir out of the ground with a chain and causes everyone in the scene to laugh by asking, "Did it work?". His character is credited as "Stan the Man", a nickname he had adopted during the Silver Age of Comic Books.
- In Captain America: The First Avenger (2011), Lee plays a general in World War II who mistakes another man for Steve Rogers / Captain America, commenting, "I thought he'd be taller." Lee did not create the character of Captain America, but created the idea of him using his shield as a throwing weapon. Furthermore, he was responsible for reviving the character in the Silver Age of Comic Books and co-wrote most of the character's stories in The Avengers and his solo stories in that period.
- In The Avengers (2012), Lee's character is interviewed about the Avengers saving Manhattan. Lee's character responds, "Superheroes in New York? Give me a break", and then returns to his game of chess. He also appears in a deleted scene in which, when a waitress flirts with Steve Rogers, Lee says to him, "Ask for her number, you moron!"
- In Iron Man 3 (2013), Lee portrays a beauty pageant judge who appears on a television monitor and happily gives one of the contestants a 10.
- In Thor: The Dark World (2013), Lee appears as a mental ward patient who loans his shoe to Erik Selvig for a demonstration about "the Convergence" in his delusions. When Selvig finishes and asks if anyone has questions, Lee says, "Yeah, can I have my shoe back?".
- In Captain America: The Winter Soldier (2014), Lee plays a security guard at the Smithsonian Institution who after discovering that Captain America stole his uniform from an exhibit, says, "Oh man, I am so fired".
- In Guardians of the Galaxy (2014), Lee appears as an elderly gentleman having a conversation with a significantly younger woman. Rocket, viewing him through a scanning device, dismisses him as part of what he saw was wrong with the planet Xandar. His catchphrase, Excelsior appears in Kree on the device. With the exception of the characters Groot, Ronan the Accuser, and the Collector, Lee did not have a hand in the creation of the comics Guardians of the Galaxy.
- In Avengers: Age of Ultron (2015), Lee appears as a World War II veteran who attends the Avengers' victory party. He claims he fought at Omaha Beach and that it proves he can handle a shot of Asgardian liquor from Thor, but is then carried away drunk, muttering his catchphrase, "Excelsior". Lee noted at the time that this was his favorite cameo before X-Men: Apocalypse.
- In Ant-Man (2015), Lee appears as a bartender in a story Luis tells to Scott Lang explaining that Sam Wilson was looking for him. His part in the story is encouraging Luis's cousin, and the informer of the story, Ignacio, to talk to a "crazy stupid fine" woman at a table separate from the bar.
- In Captain America: Civil War (2016), Lee appears as a FedEx postman, delivering a package from Steve Rogers to Tony Stark at the end of the film, mispronouncing the latter's name as "Tony Stank".
- In Doctor Strange (2016), Lee appears as a bus rider reading Aldous Huxley's The Doors of Perception, oblivious to a battle between Doctor Strange, Karl Mordo, and Kaecilius.
- In Guardians of the Galaxy Vol. 2 (2017), Lee appears as an astronaut telling a story to the Watchers, mentioning his stint as a deliveryman in Civil War. He appears again in the post-credits scenes, where the Watchers leave, tired of his stories as he quotes to them that they are his only ride back to Earth. The Watchers, along with Ego, were co-created by Lee. Lee also makes an appearance in the music video for the song "Guardians' Inferno".
- In Spider-Man: Homecoming (2017), Lee appears as an annoyed neighbor named Gary who, after witnessing Spider-Man mistakenly accosting an innocent civilian says to him, "Don't make me come down there, you punk!" His other neighbor, Marjorie, greets him, asking about his welfare, while he does the same to her, asking about her mother.
- In Thor: Ragnarok (2017), Lee appears as a servant to the Grandmaster on Sakaar who cuts Thor's hair.
- In Black Panther (2018), Lee appears as a patron of a casino in Busan, South Korea, and takes T'Challa's won, but unclaimed casino tokens.
- In Avengers: Infinity War (2018), Lee appears as the driver of Peter Parker's school bus. When the students on the bus watch Ebony Maw's ship arriving, the driver says, "What's the matter with you kids? You never seen a spaceship before?".
- In Ant-Man and the Wasp (2018), Lee appears as a pedestrian whose car is shrunk by the Wasp. He remarks, "Well the '60s were fun, but now I'm paying for it".
- In Captain Marvel (2019), Lee makes a posthumous appearance as himself, riding on a subway train and reading his lines from the screenplay for the film Mallrats. When he sees Carol Danvers, he smiles at her, and she smiles back. Although Lee did not create Danvers, the film's Captain Marvel, he co-created the first incarnation of the character in Marvel Comics. The Marvel Studios logo at the beginning of the film also pays tribute to Lee, with his MCU cameo appearances being incorporated into the logo and ending with the message "Thank You Stan".
- In Avengers: Endgame (2019), Lee makes a posthumous appearance, digitally de-aged as a car driver in 1970, driving past army base Camp Lehigh and shouting, "Hey man, make love, not war!" The scene also features Lee alongside a digital re-creation of his wife, Joan Boocock Lee, as she appeared in the year 1970. His dog, Charlotte Lee is also referenced in name under Scott Lang's name on the Wall of the Vanished that Scott Lang sees. This was the final MCU and Marvel film overall to feature a Stan Lee cameo.
- In Spider-Man: No Way Home (2021), while Lee does not appear in the film, the film's screenplay indicates that a Lee look-a-like was intended to make a cameo appearance at the end of the film when Peter Parker unsuccessfully attempts to reconnect with Michelle "MJ" Jones and Ned Leeds. In an Easter egg by the film's VFX team, Lee's birthday is used as the number plate of a taxi cab in the film's bridge fight scene.
- In Guardians of the Galaxy Vol. 3 (2023), James Gunn originally intended the character Lambshank to be voiced by and modeled after Lee. Following Lee's death, Lambshank was played by Gunn.
- In Deadpool & Wolverine (2024), Lee makes a posthumous appearance on an ad for Stanlee Steamer, parody of Stanley Steemer. The ad shows an image of Lee himself, the catchphrase "Your friendly neighborhood cleaner" (referring to the catchphrase for Spider-Man), as well as displaying his birth year 1922. Lee also appears in archival footage used for a montage in the ending credits for the film.

==== Television ====
- Lee appears in the Agents of S.H.I.E.L.D. season 1 episode, "T.R.A.C.K.S.", originally broadcast February 4, 2014. In his cameo he is portrayed as a kindly older man who sympathizes with the elaborate cover story Simmons had created.
  - Additionally his picture appears in the first episode of the web series Agents of S.H.I.E.L.D.: Slingshot (which serves as a spin-off to Agents of S.H.I.E.L.D.). His picture is seen in minute 03:10 in a box carried by Phil Coulson.
- Lee appears in the Agent Carter season 1 episode "The Blitzkrieg Button", originally broadcast on January 27, 2015. In the cameo, Lee asks Howard Stark if he can borrow his newspaper to read the sports section.
- Lee cameos in various seasons of Marvel's Netflix television series through still-photograph as a police officer of the New York City Police Department. Lee cameos in Daredevil, Jessica Jones, Luke Cage, Iron Fist, The Defenders, and The Punisher. In Iron Fist, he is identified as having assumed an identity as Captain Irving Forbush. With the exception of Daredevil, Lee did not have a hand in the creation of any of these characters.
  - In season 2 of Jessica Jones, Irving Forbush became an attorney with mention of "Forbush and Associates".
  - In Luke Cage season 2 episode "Can't Front on Me", Luke Cage passes a billboard with Lee's image, depicting a legal advertisement for Forbush stating, "Call Forbush… get what you deserve."
- Lee appears in the Hulu television series Runaways during a season 1 episode as a limousine driver for the titular team. Lee did not have a hand in the creation of the Runaways.
- Lee appears in the Freeform series Cloak & Dagger during a season 1 episode in a painting modeled after Andy Warhol's famous The Shot Marilyns. Lee did not have a hand in the creation of Cloak and Dagger.
- A tribute to Lee appears in the seventh episode of the Disney+ series WandaVision (2021) where license plate of a car belonging to Wanda Maximoff has the number "122822" representing Lee's birth date, December 28, 1922, according to the show's director Matt Shakman. It is then repeated in Spider-Man: No Way Home (2021) but this time, as a taxi number.
- In the first episode of Loki, one of the portraits within the TVA's courtroom has six people lined up, one of them resembling Stan Lee, which suggests that he was an agent to the TVA.
- Stan is referenced in the Disney+ series What If...? episode, "What If... the World Lost Its Mightiest Heroes?" as Stanley's Pizza Parlor is referenced as a delivery hat and jacket appears on Bruce Banner's desk at Culver University. This is referring to a deleted scene in The Incredible Hulk with Banner disguised as a deliverer for Stanley's pizza.

=== Non-MCU films ===
==== X-Men films ====
- In X-Men (2000), Lee appears as a hot dog stand vendor on the beach when Robert Kelly emerges naked onshore after escaping from Magneto.
- In X-Men: The Last Stand (2006), Lee and Chris Claremont appear as two of Jean Grey's neighbors in the opening scenes set 20 years in the past. Lee, credited as "Waterhose Man", is watering the lawn when Jean telekinetically redirects the water from the hose into the air.
- In Deadpool (2016), Lee appears as himself, working as an MC at a strip club and announcing an offscreen character: "Give it up for Chastity!". Lee did not have a hand in the creation of the character Deadpool.
- In X-Men: Apocalypse (2016), Lee and his wife Joan appear as witnesses to Apocalypse's nuclear missile launch. He has said this was his favorite cameo because it was different from his other cameos in that it had Joan's presence.
- Lee makes a cameo appearance in No Good Deed (2017), a short film aired before Logan in North America, in which Lee plays himself and says to Deadpool after getting his suit on in a telephone booth, "Wow, nice suit!" to which Deadpool replies "Zip it, Stan Lee!".
- In Deadpool 2 (2018), Lee appears in graffiti art as Domino is flying through the city. In the PG-13 cut of the film (Once Upon a Deadpool), the writing "RIP" was added to the graffiti art due to the cut being released after Lee's death in November 2018.

==== Spider-Man trilogy ====
- In Spider-Man (2002), he appeared during Spider-Man's first battle with the Green Goblin, pulling a young girl away from falling debris. In the DVD's deleted scenes, Lee plays a street vendor who tries to sell Peter Parker a pair of sunglasses by saying, "Oh, hey, how about these? They wore them in The X-Men"; this was likely cut due to copyright issues.
- In Spider-Man 2 (2004), Lee repeats his Spider-Man stunt with a young woman, during Spider-Man's first battle with Doctor Octopus. In a blooper scene that appears as an extra on the film's DVD release, Lee has another cameo, saying, "Spider-Man stole that kid's sneakers". Lee's actual line was supposed to be "Spider-Man stole that guy's pizza"; the line was kept in the film, but instead performed by Donnell Rawlings.
- In Spider-Man 3 (2007), Lee appears in a credited role as the "Man in Times Square". He stands next to Peter Parker, both of them reading a news ticker about Spider-Man, and commenting to Peter that, "You know, I guess one person can make a difference". He then says his catchphrase, "Nuff said", and leaves Peter to dwell on that thought.

==== Fantastic Four series ====
- In Fantastic Four (2005), Lee appears for the first time as a character that he created for the comics, Willie Lumpkin, the mail carrier who greets the Fantastic Four as they enter the Baxter Building.
- In Fantastic Four: Rise of the Silver Surfer (2007), Lee appears as himself at Reed Richards' and Susan Storm's first wedding, being turned away by a security guard for not being on the guest list. In Fantastic Four Annual #3 (1965), in which the couple married, Lee and Jack Kirby are similarly turned away.

==== The Amazing Spider-Man series ====
- In The Amazing Spider-Man (2012), Lee is a librarian at Midtown Science High School, comically oblivious to the fight between Spider-Man and the Lizard happening behind him due to listening to classical music (specifically "Left Foot Forward" by Graham Preskett) through headphones. He walks out of the library as the fight continues.
- In The Amazing Spider-Man 2 (2014), Lee is a guest at Peter Parker and Gwen Stacy's graduation. As Peter rushes behind the stage to receive his diploma, Lee remarks, "I think I know that guy!".

==== Sony's Spider-Man Universe ====
- In Venom (2018), Lee makes a cameo appearance as a man walking his dog. Lee inexplicably overhears the symbiote and Eddie Brock's discussion and encourages the two to keep Brock's relationship with Anne Weying alive and thriving. His dog interests and hungers Venom, while the symbiote asks "Who is that guy?". This was the last cameo made by Lee released before his death. Lee did not have a hand in the creation of the character Venom.
- Stan Lee makes an appearance in Venom: Let There Be Carnage (2021) on a magazine that Venom straightens up.
- On the set of Morbius (2022), Stan's catchphrase, "Excelsior", is referenced in graffiti as "XLsior!".

==== Other films ====
- In The Trial of the Incredible Hulk (1989), Lee's first appearance in a Marvel movie or TV project, outside of narrating is as a jury foreman at David Banner's trial.
- Stan Lee had filmed a cameo for the movie Blade (1998), but it was deleted in the final film. He played a cop that discovers Quinn's burning body at the vampire club. Lee did not have a hand in the creation of the character Blade. The scene has not been released.
- In Daredevil (2003), as a child, Matt Murdock stops Lee from crossing the street and getting hit by a bus.
- In Hulk (2003), he appears walking alongside former TV-series Hulk Lou Ferrigno in an early scene, both as security guards at Bruce Banner's lab. It was his first speaking role in a film based on one of his characters.
- In Man-Thing (2005), a photograph of Lee is seen on a board of missing people.
- Lee filmed a cameo in the 2010 film Kick-Ass, as a man watching news footage of the title character but was cut out from the film. The film is based on a comic book series that originated with Marvel's creator-owned imprint Icon Comics. Lee was not involved in the creation of the series or its characters.
- In Big Hero 6 (2014), Lee's voice and likeness are used for the father of character Fred. Though he appears in a portrait earlier in the film, Lee's cameo is a post-credits scene in which he demonstrates to his son that they have many things to talk about; he is credited immediately afterwards. Lee was not involved with the creation of the original Big Hero 6 comic book on which the film is based.
- Lee makes a posthumous appearance in Spider-Man: Into the Spider-Verse (2018), in which he sells a Spider-Man costume to Miles Morales. When Miles asks what would happen if the suit does not fit, Stan responds, "It always fits, eventually", before revealing that he has a no return and no refunds policy. It was important to Lord and Miller to give Lee a bigger moment in the film rather than just a passing cameo because they felt he was "so integral to the spirit of this movie." They described the role as "extra meaningful", given Lee's death in November 2018, a month before the film's release. He also appears in multiple quick moments, like a few frames of a train as it is passing by Miles swinging in New York. Lee's glasses appear after the credits in a tribute image to him and co-creator Steve Ditko.
- Lee has a cameo in a short promotional advertisement for Spider-Man: Homecoming, that aired on ABC during the network's coverage of the 2017 NBA Finals.

=== Non-MCU television series ===
- One of Lee's earliest contributions to animation based on Marvel properties was narrating the 1980s Incredible Hulk animated series, always beginning his narration with a self-introduction and ending with "This is Stan Lee saying, Excelsior!". Lee had previously narrated the "Seven Little Superheroes" episode of Spider-Man and His Amazing Friends, which the Hulk series was paired with for broadcast.
- Lee did the narration for the original 1989 X-Men animated series pilot titled X-Men: Pryde of the X-Men.
- Lee voiced himself in two episodes of Fantastic Four: "Incursion of the Skrulls" and "Super-Skrull".
- Lee was an executive producer of the 1990s animated TV series Spider-Man: The Animated Series. He appeared as himself in animated form in the final episode titled "Farewell, Spider-Man". Spider-Man is transported by Madame Web into the "real" world where he is a fictional character. He meets Lee and the two swing around until Spider-Man drops him off on top of a building; Madame Web appears and brings Spider-Man back to his homeworld. Realizing he is stuck on a roof, Lee muses, hoping the Fantastic Four will show up and lend a hand. Madame Web was voiced by Stan's wife, Joan Lee.
- In the 1994–1995 syndicated television block The Marvel Action Hour, Lee appeared as himself to give brief introductions to each episode of Iron Man and the Fantastic Four animated series.
- Lee voiced Cliff Walters, Jennifer Walters' father, in The Incredible Hulk (1996) episode "Down Memory Lane".
- He voiced the character "Frank Elson" in an episode of Spider-Man: The New Animated Series broadcast by MTV in 2003, titled "Mind Games" (Parts 1 and 2, originally aired on September 5 and 12, 2003).
- He voiced a loading-dock worker named Stan on The Spectacular Spider-Man in the episode "Blueprints".
- Lee was a recurring cast member in The Super Hero Squad Show, voicing the Mayor of Super Hero City.
- He voiced the character "General Wallace" in the first episode of Black Panther.
- Lee made recurring appearances in the Disney XD TV series Ultimate Spider-Man, voicing a high school janitor named Stan, in which he makes references to Lee's real-life career. In the episodes "Great Power" and "Why I Hate Gym", he mentions Irving Forbush, an in-joke character Lee co-created in 1955 as a literary device. In the episode "Stan By Me", Stan, along with Mary Jane Watson, Phil Coulson, and Harry Osborn, helps Spider-Man fight the Lizard. At the end of the episode, it is revealed that Stan is a founding member of S.H.I.E.L.D. and is aware of Peter Parker's secret identity as Spider-Man. Other references, such as a boat called USS Excelsior, appear throughout the series.
- Lee has appeared in Hulk and the Agents of S.M.A.S.H.. He was first alluded to as a salesman in the pilot episode, "Doorway to Destruction", and later appeared in a recurring role as the mayor of Vista Verde, a town near the titular group's headquarters.
- Lee reprises his role as Fred's father in Big Hero 6: The Series. The first episode implies that his name is Frederick Frederickson III. Later episodes reveal that he was once a famous superhero named Boss Awesome, and that he had a steampunk-themed nemesis named Baron Von Steamer, who also appears in the present as an enemy of Big Hero 6. While Lee had finished season one while still alive, he had recorded dialogue for season two before his death. The episode "Supersonic Sue" is dedicated to him.
- Lee portrayed a future version of Tony Stark in "Episode 205 – The Future!" of the comedy web series Avengers Assemble!. In this episode, he delivered from the future a cryptic message to the rest of his fellow Avengers, but constantly frustrated his companions due to his ineptness with the technology of his future era.
- Lee appears several times in the refurbished version of The Amazing Adventures of Spider-Man.
- In the Phineas and Ferb crossover special Mission Marvel (2013), Lee cameos as a New York City hot dog vendor who moves to Danville later in the episode.
- Stan Lee's minifigure appeared in computer-animated Lego films Lego Marvel Super Heroes: Maximum Overload and Trouble in Wakanda as a food vendor and in The Thanos Threat as one of the Ravagers.
- Lee appeared in one of the "Origin Shorts" from the 2017 animated series Spider-Man as a cameraman who interviews Peter Parker before he enters a wrestling match. He also appeared in the second-season episode "Bring on the Bad Guys".
- Lee has a non-speaking cameo in the series premiere of The Gifted, walking out of a bar that one of the characters is entering.
- Lee appears in the Guardians of the Galaxy episode "Mission: Breakout" as an elevator operator at the Collector's lair.
- Lee has a posthumous cameo in the Avengers Assemble episode "T'Chanda" (2019) as an army general.
- Lee has a posthumous cameo in the Marvel Future Avengers anime series episode "Green Goblin vs. The Hulk" (2020) as a hot dog vendor.

=== Book appearances ===
- Lee makes an appearance in Spider-Man Ultimate Picture Book by Kathleen Duey, Robert Gould, and Eugene Epstein as a scientist overlooking Norman Osborn examining a genetically enhanced spider; the same one that will eventually bite Peter Parker.
- Lee makes an appearance in the novel Spider-Man: The Gathering of the Sinister Six by Adam-Troy Castro. In the book, “publishing mogul, Stan Lee…” is recognized by Peter Parker as being in attendance at Brick Johnson's funeral.

=== Theme park attraction appearances ===
- Stan Lee Boulevard exists at Universal's Islands of Adventure.
- Lee appears four times in The Amazing Adventures of Spider-Man attraction at Universal's Islands of Adventure theme park in Orlando, Florida. In all four appearances, Lee is wearing an orange pullover sweater, but has no dialogue or name identification. Following Lee's death, pictures of him were put at the front desk.
- Lee himself does not appear on The Incredible Hulk Coaster but for promoting the ride's reopening in August 2016, Stan appeared on the Universal Orlando Resort YouTube channel and went to Universal as a flat cardboard cut out, riding the Hulk coaster as a sticker on a seat with his voice over it.
- Lee makes a cameo as one of the Collector's prisoners in Guardians of the Galaxy – Mission: Breakout!.
- Lee appears in the safety video/pre-show for the Iron Man Experience attractions found at Hong Kong Disneyland.
- The Disneyland meet and greet for Captain Marvel shows Lee's birth and death dates on a crate.

=== Video game appearances ===
- Lee narrated the 2000 video game Spider-Man, its 2001 sequel Spider-Man 2: Enter Electro, and the 2010 video game Spider-Man: Shattered Dimensions. Additionally, in 2000's Spider-Man, alongside playing the narrator, Lee's name spelled backwards (EEL_NATS) on the PS1 version serves as a cheat code that, when entered, will unlock everything in the game.
- Lee made his first-ever onscreen video game appearance as a senator named after himself in Marvel: Ultimate Alliance 2.
- Lee narrates Iron Man: Armored Avenger, The Avengers Origins: Hulk, The Amazing Spider-Man: An Origin Story, and Avengers Origins: Assemble! apps for the iPad, iPhone, and iPod Touch, which were released by Disney Publishing Worldwide in February 2012.
- Lee is a playable character in Activision's The Amazing Spider-Man video game, which was released in June 2012, as a tie-in to the film of the same name. In the game, Lee is depicted as having the same superpowers as Spider-Man which he uses to retrieve the pages of a new comic book manuscript that he had written but lost and subsequently scattered around Manhattan. He also voices a character with his first name in the main story mode, who calls Peter about the charges to his credit card when Peter's walking to Curt Connors' sewer lab.
- Lee appears as a playable Lego version of himself in Lego Marvel Super Heroes (released October 2013), where he was able to turn into a Hulk-like creature but with the same hair, mustache, and glasses. He is referred to as "Excelsior Hulk", a play on the Hulk and Lee's catchphrase.
- Lee voiced S.H.I.E.L.D. Agent Lee in the game Marvel Heroes Omega.
- Lee reprised his role, appearing as himself in The Amazing Spider-Man 2 video game, which was released in April 2014, as a tie-in to the film of the same name. He can be seen whenever Spider-Man enters the comic book store.
- Lee voiced a playable Lego version of himself in Lego Marvel's Avengers, where he is able to turn into Excelsior Hulk again but also into Iron Stan and the Stanbuster. During the credits sequence, his character is cleaning Tony Stark's apartment, casually picks up Mjolnir, and accidentally shoots a bolt of lightning across the room.
- Lee appears as a playable Lego version of himself in Lego Marvel Super Heroes 2, where he has the powers of Thor, Galactus, and Spider-Man; he is able to complete the Gwenpool missions.
- Lee makes a brief cameo in Spider-Man (2018) as a short-order cook. The game's downloadable content, The City That Never Sleeps, features a dedication to him in the credits.
- In Spider-Man: Miles Morales, there is a statue of Lee next to Mick's diner, which he owned in Spider-Man.
- In Marvel's Guardians of the Galaxy, Stan Lee's glasses appear as an Easter egg in the Collector's Emporium describing the man who wore them as a "powerful cosmic entity seemingly capable of being anywhere in the galaxy at any given time", it also references his cameos themselves and includes his catchphrase, "Excelsior".

== Non-Marvel appearances ==
=== Film appearances ===
- Lee appears as himself in director Larry Cohen's The Ambulance (1990), in which Eric Roberts plays an aspiring comics artist.
- Lee has an extensive cameo in the 1995 Kevin Smith film Mallrats. He plays himself, this time visiting the mall to sign books at a comic store. Later, he takes on the role of a sage-like character, giving Jason Lee's character, Brodie Bruce (a longtime fan of Stan's), advice on his love life. He also recorded interviews with Smith for the non-fiction video Stan Lee's Mutants, Monsters & Marvels (2002). Lee made another cameo in a Smith film, 2016's Yoga Hosers, as a police officer.
- Lee makes a cameo appearance as the "Three Stooges Wedding Guest" in the 2004 Disney film The Princess Diaries 2: Royal Engagement.
- Lee plays himself in the 2011 Frankie Muniz film Pizza Man.
- Lee makes a posthumous appearance in Madness in the Method (2019). This marks his final film appearance and the film is dedicated to him.
- Lee makes a posthumous appearance in Jay and Silent Bob Reboot (2019) through the use of archival footage of himself and Kevin Smith taken from Comic Con. The film's original third act was to revolve around Lee, with an extended performance from him as a main character; however, given principal photography on the film did not commence until three months after Lee's death, the entire third act of the script was rewritten.

=== Animation ===
==== POW! Entertainment appearances ====
- Lee voiced himself as a security guard in the film Mosaic, which he created.
- He voiced the Grandfather in the film The Condor, which he also created.
- He voiced himself as the main protagonist in the film Stan Lee's Mighty 7. In the movie, he goes to the desert to search for new ideas for a comic book hero and runs into two groups of aliens along the way that he mentors to be a superhero team while he uses them to write comic books.

==== Other appearances ====
- Lee made a brief cameo in a post-credits scene of the 2013 adult animated film Jay & Silent Bob's Super Groovy Cartoon Movie. During his appearance, Lee visits Bluntman and Chronic to talk to them about the "Avenger Initiative".
- Stan Lee makes a vocal cameo as himself in Teen Titans Go! To the Movies (2018), his only official cameo in a DC Comics project. As the film is a satire about superhero movies in general, his tendency toward making cameos is satirized. In the film, when he realizes that he is in a DC film and not a Marvel one, he declares that he needs to leave. He shows up again later, stating that he does not care if it is a DC film, he just loves making cameos, and shouts "Excelsior!".
- An internet avatar of Lee makes a cameo in Ralph Breaks the Internet (2018) during the "Oh My Disney" sequence. While it was reported that he had recorded lines, his character actually remains silent and is only seen interacting with Iron Man before being interrupted by Vanellope.

=== Television ===
==== Documentary appearances ====
- Lee was an interviewee in the Ron Mann–directed documentary film Comic Book Confidential in 1988.
- Stan Lee appeared in episode 7 season 5 of Chuck as a los Angeles CIA spy
- In the 1990s, Lee hosted the documentary series The Comic Book Greats and interviewed notable comic book creators such as Chris Claremont, Jim Lee, Todd McFarlane, Rob Liefeld and Whilce Portacio.
- Lee was an interviewee on the French-Canadian documentary Once Upon a Time: The Super Heroes in 2001.
- Lee appeared in a 2002 documentary film Stan Lee's Mutants, Monsters & Marvels.
- Lee was an interviewee on The History Channel television documentary Comic Book Superheroes Unmasked in 2003.
- Lee appeared in the 2009 documentary "How Bruce Lee Changed the World".
- Lee hosted the 2010 History documentary series Stan Lee's Superhumans.
- Lee appears with director Kevin Smith and 2000s Marvel editor-in-chief Joe Quesada in the documentary Marvel Then & Now: An Evening with Stan Lee and Joe Quesada (which was hosted by Smith).
- Lee was interviewed on the History show Stan Lee's Superhumans by Daniel Browning Smith, who held several Guinness Records for extreme flexibility due to having Ehlers–Danlos syndrome, a genetic condition affecting collagen formation. Smith had created his own comic book to display his own struggles as an outcast for his flexibility, and legitimately surprised Lee with a quick demonstration of his talent.
- Lee was interviewed in the 2011 documentary Superheroes.
- Lee is among the interview subjects in Superheroes: A Never-Ending Battle, a three-hour documentary narrated by Liev Schreiber that premiered on PBS in October 2013.
- He was the subject of an April 2012 Epix cable-network documentary, With Great Power: The Stan Lee Story.

==== Other appearances ====
- Lee made a cameo appearance in Episode 17 of the web-series Super Power Beat Down, where he plays a man reading a newspaper who tells fighting Spider-Man and Darth Maul to keep the noise down or else he will get angry.
- Lee hosted and judged contestants in the Syfy series Who Wants to Be a Superhero?
- Lee made an appearance on December 21, 2006, on the NBC game show Identity.
- Lee appeared as himself in "The Excelsior Acquisition", a third season episode of The Big Bang Theory, in March 2010. He appears at the front door of his house wearing Fantastic Four pajamas (ultimately calling back into the house, "Joanie, call the police!" to get rid of Sheldon, who showed up after missing a comic book signing at the local store), and ordered a restraining order against him.
- He plays a bus driver in the sixteenth episode of the first season of Heroes. The series is not directly based on any of Lee's work, but is strongly inspired by comics he created such as X-Men and Inhumans.
- Lee made a guest appearance as himself in "Bottom's Up", a season seven episode of the TV series Entourage.
- He guest-starred as Dr. Lee (aka: Generalissimo) in "Glimpse", a season four episode of Eureka that aired in July 2011.
- Lee appears in "The Guardian", the October 7, 2010 episode of Nikita, as Hank Excelsior, a witness to a bank robbery who is interviewed by a TV reporter.
- Lee portrayed himself at a CIA holiday party in the fifth season of Chuck, in which it is revealed in that universe he secretly works for the government and has a romantic interest in General Beckman.
- Lee appeared in the eleventh episode of season five of The Guild, in which he was captured at a convention by the character Zaboo's Master Chief cosplaying henchmen.
- Lee appears as a version of himself in 3 episodes of Stan Lee's Lucky Man: series 1 episode 1, series 2 episode 4 and series 3 episode 1.
- Lee appeared as a judge in the second-season premiere of the web series Video Game High School.
- Lee appears as the character "Stanley Doyle" in an animated special of Stan Lee's Lucky Man titled Stan Lee's Lucky Man: The Bracelet Chronicles.
- Lee was a celebrity diner at the chef's table in an episode of the twelfth season of the reality competition show, Hell's Kitchen, broadcast in 2014.
- Lee made a guest appearance as himself in "Pie vs. Cake", a season three episode of the TV series Fresh Off the Boat. He reviews the comic sent by Eddie and Emery.
- Lee appeared as himself in a 2017 episode of Pawn Stars when he was asked to authenticate an original 1977 The Amazing Spider-Man comic strip signed by John Romita Sr. and himself.

==== Animation ====
===== Other appearances =====
- In the animated series Jim Henson's Muppet Babies, Lee plays himself in the episode "Comic Capers" during a live-action scene (in connection with his involvement with The Amazing Spider-Man comic strip).
- In the original version of the Superman: The Animated Series episode "Apokolips... Now!", Stan Lee's likeness appears among a crowd mourning the death of Dan Turpin, a character based on his longtime Marvel Comics collaborator Jack Kirby. When the episode was released on DVD, the scene was altered to remove the likeness of Lee and other background Marvel characters.
- He voiced the character "Jerry" in an episode of Stripperella (which he created) titled "Crime Doesn't Pay... Seriously, It Doesn't".
- Lee appeared as himself in an extended self-parodying sketch on the episode "Tapping a Hero" of Robot Chicken, in 2007. He also appeared as himself in the episodes "Executed by the State" (2012) and "Robot Fight Accident" (2013).
- Lee has made various appearances in The Simpsons. In "I Am Furious (Yellow)" (2002), a season 13 episode, Lee voices an animated version of himself. Lee also appeared on the commentary track along with other Simpsons writers and directors on the episode for The Simpsons Season 13 box set released in 2010. In an earlier episode, "Worst Episode Ever" (2001), Lee's picture is seen next to several others on the wall behind the register, under the heading "Banned for life". Lee later officiated Comic Book Guy's wedding in "Married to the Blob" (2014). He later appeared in a couch gag cameo in "The Caper Chase" (2017) as the Simpson family arrives as X-Men characters (Homer Simpson as Professor X, Marge Simpson is Krusty the Clown then transforms into Mystique, Lisa Simpson is Storm, Maggie Simpson is Wolverine, and Bart Simpson is Angel). Lee appears and says "There is nothing too short that I can't cameo."
- Lee voiced himself in the comedy web series How It Should Have Ended, in the episode for The Amazing Spider-Man.
- Lee appeared in the comedy web series "Bad Days", a web series that depicts different comic book characters having a bad day, cameoing in each episode.
- Lee's Chakra: The Invincible premiered on Rovio Entertainment's Toons.TV channel in 2014 and had made a video for the Angry Birds YouTube channel to promote it.
- Lee lent his voice to "The Amazing Man-Spider", a segment of the May 2013 episode of the satirical animated TV series MAD. The segment depicts the story of what happened to the radioactive spider that bit Peter Parker.
- Lee appeared in the anime Heroman, which he co-created, as a patron of the restaurant where the protagonist Joey Jones worked cameoing in each episode.
- Lee appeared in the 2021 streaming series Superhero Kindergarten, which is an adaptation of his comic book series of the same name.
- The Simpsons short film The Good, the Bart, and the Loki (2021), a crossover between The Simpsons and the Marvel Studios production Loki, was originally intended to feature a cameo of Lee, but according to showrunner Al Jean, Marvel Studios denied them permission to include Lee as they have decided to not feature him in any more productions since his death.

=== Music video appearances ===
- Lee made a cameo in the music video for the song "Eyes Wired Shut" by Edgewater.
- Lee appears in X Japan's unreleased music video for their song "Born to Be Free".
- Lee made a cameo in Bart Baker's parody of "Elastic Heart" by Sia when he bails Sia (played by Amanda Hosler) out of jail for the pedophilia in her Elastic Heart video to star in her own superhero movie with Shia LaBeouf (played by Baker) and Kanye West (played by Warren Barrow) as the main villain.

=== Video game appearances ===
- The episodic Poptropica island, Poptropicon, features a character who is said to be the creator of one of the island's fictional comic book characters named Stan Ditkio, who was based on both Lee and another famous Marvel comic creator, Steve Ditko.
- Following Lee's death, Blizzard Entertainment added a non-player character named "Stanley" modeled off Lee to the game World of Warcraft, even shouting his catchphase, "Excelsior!".
- Stan's iconic catchphrase featured in Fortnite: Battle Royale in the Avengers: Endgame promotional game-mode. Instead of "Victory Royale" when winning a game, the game shows "Universe Saved" or "Balanced Restored" depending on if whether the player fought on the Avengers Side or with Thanos and the Chitauri's; either way "Excelsior!" is at the bottom of the screen.

== See also ==
- List of cameo appearances by Alfred Hitchcock
- List of cameo appearances by Peter Jackson
