= Webisode =

Episode of a web series

A webisode (portmanteau of "web" and "episode") is an episode of a web series. It is a single installment of a web series program. The length of a webisode is short and ranges from 3–15 minutes.

A webisode is distributed through the public Internet, on personal websites and video-sharing websites such as Vimeo or YouTube. It is available for either streaming or download. The format can be used as part of a collection of shorts, an advertisement, preview, promotion, or raw metadata.

== History ==
Webisodes have become increasingly common in the midst of the post-broadcast era, which implies that audiences are drifting away past free-to-use television design. The post-broadcast era has been influenced by new media formats such as the Internet. Contemporary trends indicate that the Internet has become the dominant mechanism for accessing Media Content. In 2012, the Nielsen Company reported that the number of American households with television access has diminished for the second straight year, showing that viewers are transitioning away from broadcast television. In 2021, the Nielsen Company recorded that for the first time, streaming video audience was greater than broadcast. The post-broadcast era is best defined as embodiment by a complex mediascape that cannot be maintained by broadcast television; in its wake, the popularity of webisodes has expanded because the internet has become a potential solution to television's ailments by combining interpersonal communication and multimedia elements alongside entertainment programing.

These original web series are a means to monetize this transitional audience and produce new celebrities, both independently on the web and working in accordance to the previous media industry standards. Content has moved onto the web not through the conventional media's branded websites, but through video services like YouTube; the distribution of television increasingly occurs through viral, rather than broadcast, networks such as those available through blogs or social networking services. Webisodes are also noted for their use of the Internet for further exchange of information, news and gossip about the series on various social networks.

== Uses in marketing ==
Webisodes are part of a trend called branded entertainment, which is growing due to the increased demand for marketers to find new methods to reach consumers in an era where the traditional media is losing viewers to the social web. Companies create a social buzz online using digitalmedia marketing to generate branded community-based destinations. Webisodes are regularly used by marketers to form these destinations.

In 2006, for example, hip-hop entrepreneur Sean Combs, aka P. Diddy, started his own YouTube channel called "DiddyTV," which he used to post webisodes and blog about his life on tour. Combs built hype around the web series by using his social media sites, such as Myspace, to direct users to the YouTube channel. Combs' webisodes were sponsored by Burger King, which used the web series to generate a brand community.

In 2007, Mini Cooper initiated an online marketing campaign to promote their new line of vehicles. The campaign consisted of six webisodes that were each four minutes in duration. Each week a new webisode went up on sites like YouTube. The series was a spoof on the retro television show, Starsky & Hutch and was titled "Hammer & Coop." The series told the story of a 1970s based character named Hammer and his car named Coop, while highlighting the improvement of new Mini Cooper's interior.

In 2011, Jeff Schroeder, known for his role in the reality series The Amazing Race, assisted AT&T with a digital marketing scheme based around webisodes. The campaign followed Schroeder around the world in 100 days using only his phone and netbook.

== Web-based comedy series ==
Some of the most notable webisodes are original comedies generated for an audience online viewers. Original comedies have become the preferred genre for webisodes because they deliver a low budget format for experimentation and prompt results. These original web comedies are a means to monetize the audience.

The model for the popular website Funny or Die, is based entirely on distributing a variety of original comedy web series. Comedians Will Ferrell and Adam McKay started this initiative with their series of webisodes about a vulgar two-year-old landlord. The series was streamed over 50 million times on Funny or Die and led the site to earning over $50 million annually. Funny or Die received serious attention from major television outlets, resulting in a partnership with HBO and the program Funny or Die Presents, which aired on HBO from 2010-2011 and featured recycled footage that had already run on the website.

== Etymology ==
Origins:

- 1995: Created by the first Internet serialized fiction called The Spot created by Scott Zakarin. "Webisodic" was used to describe the series.
- 1996: Earlier usage by the textually based seaQuest 2047 to describe their periodic publications, beginning circa 1996.
- 1998–99: First public use of the word webisode, attributed to Stan Lee Media in the marketing and promotion of The 7th Portal online superhero series created by Stan Lee.
- 2009: webisode is introduced as a word into the Merriam-Webster's Collegiate Dictionary.

== See also ==
- Duanju
- Original net animation
- Vlog
- Webcast
- Webtoon
- Webnovela
- Digital content
