= Vinesauce =

Online content creator collective

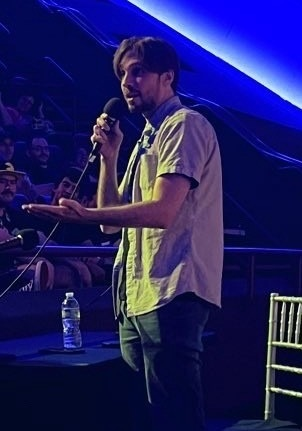
- Vinny hosting the Vinesauce panel at Long Island Retro Con, 2024
- Born: Vincent (Note: Sources differ on his last name.); May 12, 1985 (age 41); New York City, U.S.
- Occupation: Live streamers

Twitch information
- Channel: Vinesauce
- Years active: 2012–present
- Genre: Gaming
- Followers: 636 thousand

YouTube information
- Channel: Vinesauce
- Years active: 2010–present
- Genres: Gaming; Comedy; Music
- Subscribers: 4.22 million (combined) (Note: Subscribers, broken down by channel: 1.23 million (Vinesauce) 807 thousand (Vargskelethor Joel) 637 thousand (Vinesauce: The Full Sauce) 478 thousand (Vargskelethor Uncut: Full Joel Streams) 397 thousand (Limealicious) 372 thousand (Vinesauce: Twitch Clips) 67.8 thousand (Revscarecrow) 54.7 thousand (Vargskelethor: Twitch Clips) 49.5 thousand (Lime Archives) 39.7 thousand (RevScarecrow: After Hours) 12.9 thousand (Imakuni Full Streams) 12.5 thousand (Potato) 3.06 thousand (FreddyT09) 5.77 thousand (ALTAKARI) 1.73 thousand (ALT Akari Archive))
- Views: 1.69 billion (combined) (Note: Views, broken down by channel: 456.41 million (Vinesauce) 485.43 million (Vinesauce: The Full Sauce) 210.53 million (Vinesauce: Twitch Clips) 21.08 million (Vinesauce: The Extra Sauce) 168.48 million (Vargskelethor Joel) 241.55 million (Vargskelethor Uncut: Full Joel Streams) 24.35 million (Vargskelethor: Twitch Clips) 1.17 million (Imakuni Full Streams) 113.27 thousand (FreddyT09) 10.7 million (Revscarecrow) 9 million (RevScarecrow: After Hours) 57.06 million (Limealicious) 4.61 million (Lime Archives) 513.96 thousand (ALTAKARI) 111.9 thousand (ALT Akari Archive) 4.10 million (Potato))
- Last updated: July 10, 2025
- Website: vinesauce.com

Vinesauce is the professional name of American live streamer and YouTuber Vincent (born May 12, 1985), also known online as "Vinny Vinesauce". Vinny originally founded Vinesauce in 2010 as a streaming collective of content creators, which gradually became inactive since the late 2010s. The former lineup of the collective comprised Vincent, Darren, Joel Johansson, Marisa, Jen, Colin, Fred, Aisha, and Jonathan.

Primarily focused on video game livestreaming and commentary, Vinesauce is known for its content on game corruptions and subsequent glitches, as well as content covering obscure games and other media, including the 1995 virtual world game Active Worlds. In 2014, the collective created the "Vinesauce is HOPE" charity drive, which has raised over $350,000. Two Vinesauce members have each formed their own bands: Vinny co-founding the rock band Red Vox, and Joel co-founding the thrash metal band Scythelord.

The popularity of Vinesauce's content has earned media coverage from video game outlets such as Kotaku and PC Gamer. Vinesauce's videos have also been credited for popularizing several internet memes.

== History ==
Vincent (Note: Sources differ on his last name.) was born on May 12, 1985, in New York City. In 2010, under the pseudonym Vinny, he formed Vinesauce as a streaming community and YouTube channel. Inspired by both the nascent medium of streaming and a dream he had where he streamed the SNES video game Chrono Trigger, Vinny created an account on Livestream to stream the game, eventually learning aspects of streaming over time. Adopting the alias "Vinny Vinesauce" as his online pseudonym, Vinny later founded the Vinesauce website and recruited other streamers and content creators as members of the community. Since the late 2010s, the group has gradually become independent as most of the members focus more on their individual content.

== Content ==
=== General ===
Vinesauce's content primarily focuses on hacks and mods of various retro games such as Super Mario 64 and its Chaos mod, The Legend of Zelda, Half-Life, Pokémon and Metal Gear Solid. Their content on retro games, in which they employ ROM corruptions and code manipulation to produce random glitches and effects, have been described as creepy and frightening from various media outlets. Vinesauce's process for game corruptions involves the use of a "corruptor", a program which arbitrarily rearranges a video game's machine code to recontextualize the game with new effects. Several of these effects range from humorous in nature to surprising and ghastly, with some corruptions offering new challenges to older games. Notable corruptors they have used include the "Vinesauce ROM Corruptor" and the "Real Time Corruptor" (RTC). Maxwell McGee of GamesRadar+ detailed the process of Vinesauce's corruption videos, stating that "using the Vinesauce corruptor is like tuning a guitar, only instead of making something sound good you want it to sound as horrific as possible without completely falling apart." The group has also recorded videos of them playing various other games such as Cyberpunk 2077, Fallout 4, and Super Mario Maker.

=== Notable videos ===
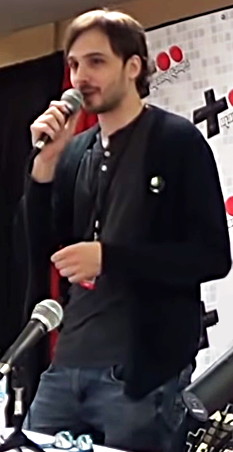
Vincent at the gaming convention TooManyGames in 2016

==== Active Worlds ====
In 2016, Vinesauce received mainstream attention for Vinny's livestream of the 1995 virtual world game Active Worlds. Taking place in March 2016, the stream involved Vinny venturing in the virtual world until encountering a user named "Hitomi Fujiko", a player who appeared to exhibit non-player character traits. Vinny had initially assumed Fujiko was a character intended to guide players through the virtual world, but after various interactions with Fujiko, he slowly realized the character had evinced human-like traits. Vinny and Fujiko's interaction escalated with a conversation where Fujiko knew Vinny's name despite him registering his account as Vinesauce; shortly after, Fujiko left the server. 6,000 people watched the stream unfold with many of them attempting to register accounts to join Vinny's session, leading to an overload of the game's servers. The stream had led Vinesauce's fan base to uncover clues about the mystery surrounding Fujiko's actions, with Alex Avard of GamesRadar+ asserting that "the events that followed were mythologized into one of the internet's best creepypasta stories." In 2018, author Andrew Reinhard cited the Active Worlds videos as an example of archaeogaming in the book Archaeogaming: An Introduction to Archaeology in and of Video Games.

==== Fake farm game ====
In 2021, several of Vinesauce member Vargskelethor Joel's videos were cited in a mystery about a farming game that never existed. The mystery came into existence when a Reddit user named "Sparta123" wrote a thread on r/tipofmyjoystick describing a farming game akin to Harvest Moon that they tried to recall, with the premise involving a man who kills his wife and tries to hide the body while working as a farmer. Sparta123's post led the game rumor to spread to various social media communities, with users attempting to investigate the existence of the farming game. In a video essay, YouTuber Justin Whang revealed that the premise of the game originated from a 2015 clip from one of Joel's streams playing the game Global Defense Force. Whang cited a Reddit post from user "PM_MeYourEars" and a Discord post from "AqueousSnake" that identified an animated clip from one of Joel's streams. Sparta123 later confirmed that Joel's video was "likely the source of the game," with Joel later apologizing in a Twitch stream for the time that users had wasted in searching for a non-existent game. The urban legend was planned to be put into a real game, yet never realized, titled The Evil Farming Game: Replanted

== Other ventures ==
=== Philanthropy ===
In 2014, Vinesauce created the Vinesauce is HOPE charity drive, a variety gaming stream where proceeds go to the Pediatric Cancer Research Foundation (PCRF); former Vinesauce member Hootey is credited with the idea for the event. In 2017 the Vinesauce is HOPE stream raised over $137,000 and in 2019 they raised over $218,000.

=== Red Vox ===
Red Vox
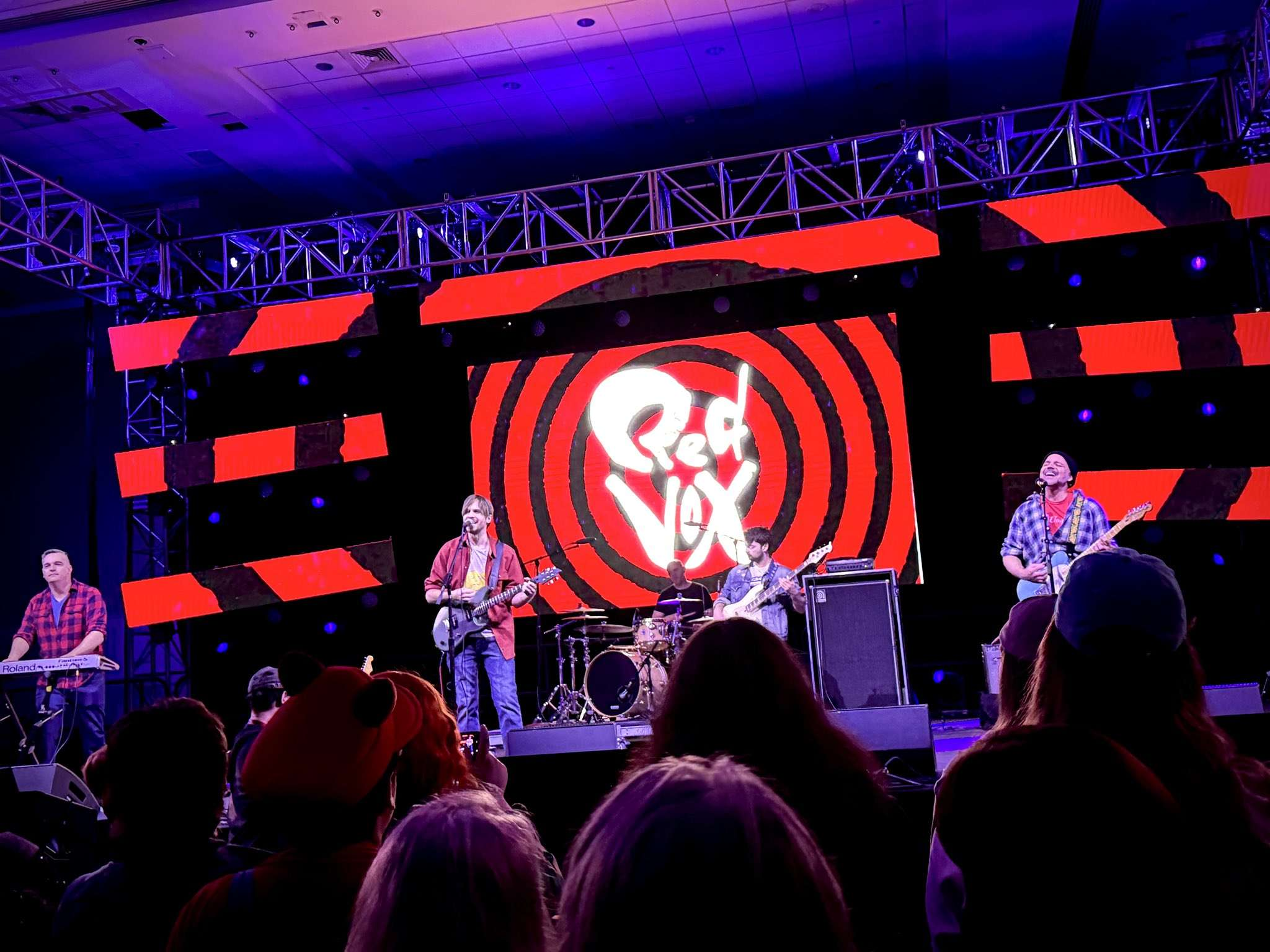
- Red Vox performing at Super MAGFest in 2025

Background information
- Origin: New York City, U.S.
- Genres: Alternative rock; indie rock; psychedelic rock; neo-psychedelia
- Years active: 2015–present
- Members: Vinny; Jerrold Kavanagh; Joe Pecora; Bill Gagliardi; Joe "New Joe" Imburgio
- Past members: Mike
- Website: redvoxband.com

Red Vox is a rock band formed by Vinny and former drummer Mike (Jabroni Mike) in 2015. Their music is primarily alternative rock with influences from psychedelic rock. Vinny has stated that rock bands such as Radiohead, Nirvana, Pink Floyd and Tame Impala were inspirations for the group's music.

Red Vox has released 6 albums (Note: Visions and Afterthoughts, while first released separately, are advertised by the band as one double album.) and 2 EPs in total. Their second album Another Light was released in 2017 and peaked at #13 on the Billboard Top Heatseekers chart. In 2024, Mike left the band due to health problems. On January 26, 2026, Vinny was invited by CNN to speak on the gradual growth of his band and the development of their 6th album, Retcon. Later that year, Vinny spoke about the release of his band's 7th album, Pigeonhole, in an interview with CBS News.

==== Live Performances ====
Red Vox began performing live in 2016. They performed their biggest show to date for an audience of "between 1200 and 1500" at MAGFest in January 2025. The band went on tour in summer 2026, including a performance at Thalia Hall in Chicago for an audience of 800.

==== Discography ====
Albums
Title	Year
What Could Go Wrong	2016
Another Light	2017
Kerosene	2019
Realign	2020
Visions	2022
Afterthoughts	2023
Retcon	2026
Pigeonhole	2026

Compilation albums
Title	Year
Visions and Afterthoughts	2023

Extended plays
Title	Year
Blood Bagel	2016
Lost for a While	2020

Singles
Title	Year	Album
"There She Goes"	2015	What Could Go Wrong
"Hazy"	2015	What Could Go Wrong
"Back to School"	2015	What Could Go Wrong
"Trolls and Goblins"	2015	Non-album single
"Atom Bomb"	2016	What Could Go Wrong
"From the Stars"	2017	Another Light
"In the Garden"	2017	Another Light
"Reno"	2017	Another Light
"Stranded"	2018	Non-album single
"Why Can't This Be Easy"	2019	Realign
"Ozymandias"	2020	Realign
"Realign"	2020	Realign
"There's a Place / Elessar"	2021	Visions
"Choking on the Spite"	2022	Visions
"Jumped the Gun"	2022	Afterthoughts
"Almost a Stranger"	2022	Afterthoughts
"Forgetter"	2023	Afterthoughts
"Playing by the Rules"	2023	Afterthoughts
"Garbage Land"	2024	Non-album single
"Remember"	2024	Retcon
"A/V"	2025	Retcon
"Crony"	2025	Retcon
"The New Flesh"	2025	Retcon
"Over a Life"	2025	Retcon
"Bad Bad World"	2026	Pigeonhole
"Rent Free"	2026	Pigeonhole
"Rotten Apples & Sour Grapes"	2026	Pigeonhole

Filmography
Year	Title	Role	Notes
2023–present	Monkey Wrench	Vinethop (voice), Armstrong (voice)	Episode: S1E2 "Lythop Liberation", S1E4 "Plague Walker", S1E5 "Interloper"
2026	Gameoverse	Orph (voice)	Episode: "Pilot"
2026	Spooky Month	Mushroom Audience (voice)	Episode: S1E7 "The Wacky Wicked Woods"

=== Other work ===
In 2014, Vinny interviewed video game developer Edmund McMillen to discuss secrets surrounding his game The Binding of Isaac. In 2020, Vinny appeared in an episode of the Boundary Break web series focused on the out-of-bounds content of Animal Crossing: New Horizons. In 2022, Vinny interviewed the actor Jack Mulcahy for starring in Creating Rem Lezar and discussed topics relating to insight on actors and film production. They also discussed the emotional aspects of the film and how Rem Lezar was specifically designed.

== Impact ==
Vinesauce's videos have been credited for popularizing Internet memes, such as The Daily Dot citing Joel's RollerCoaster Tycoon videos as bringing various memes to a wider audience. Vinny's level creations on Super Mario Maker have also inspired similar creepypasta-based levels in the game.

TechRadar cited Vinesauce as one of the 10 best YouTube channels playing games in a 2016 listicle, noting Vinny's Active Worlds videos and the channel's focus on esoteric games and mods. In 2021, Vinesauce was cited as an example of a "comfort creator" in an article from The New York Times.

On February 20, 2020, the Washington-based provider Wave Broadband had its Emergency Alert System equipment hijacked, causing approximately 3,000 customers in Jefferson County to receive multiple false messages, including one telling viewers to subscribe to Vinesauce on Twitch. This was unaffiliated with Vinesauce, Vinny commented on a livestream from September 2026 that that he nor any affiliated creators were involved with the hijacking.

On September 30, 2022, Vinny was invited by CNN to speak about his experience with the musical-comedy game Trombone Champ. In November 2022, he was again invited by CNN to speak about his experience with the video game Placid Plastic Duck Simulator with Rick Damigella.

== Awards and nominations ==
Ceremony	Year	Category	Result	Ref.
The Streamer Awards	2025	Best Variety Streamer	Nominated	

== Members ==
There were nine members of Vinesauce, which gradually became inactive since the late 2010s. Sourced from their official website.

Members	Alias	Notes
Vincent	Vinny Vinesauce	Founder
Darren	Potato	
Joel Johansson	Vargskelethor	
Marisa	Imakuni	
Jen	Umjammerjenny	
Colin	Revscarecrow	
Fred		
Aisha	Limealicious	
Jonathan	Dorb	

== See also ==
- List of YouTubers
