= Mind Meld =

2001 American documentary film by Peter Jaysen

- Original DVD cover (2001)
- Directed by: Peter Jaysen
- Produced by: William Shatner; Scott Zakarin; Rich Tackenberg; Peter Jaysen
- Starring: William Shatner; Leonard Nimoy
- Narrated by: Billy West
- Cinematography: Adam Biggs
- Edited by: Mark Panik
- Production company: Creative Light Entertainment
- Release date: November 6, 2001 (Home video)
- Running time: 75 minutes
- Country: United States
- Language: English

Mind Meld: Secrets Behind the Voyage of a Lifetime is a 2001 American documentary film in which actors William Shatner and Leonard Nimoy discuss the Star Trek franchise and its effects on their lives. Shatner and Nimoy portrayed the characters James T. Kirk and Spock respectively in the 1960s Star Trek television series, the 1970s animated television series, and their film sequels.

They talk about differences they had with Gene Roddenberry, the creator of Star Trek, and about the strained relationships between Shatner and some of the other cast members. It was in this film that Nimoy first publicly revealed that he had struggled with alcoholism while he was acting in the original television series. Shatner talks about the death of his third wife, Nerine Kidd, who accidentally drowned in a pool in 1999 after suffering from alcoholism.

Mind Meld was produced to advertise Shatner's personal website. Filming took place at Nimoy's home on September 5, 2001, and Billy West narrated the title sequence. The film's title refers to a fictional practice in Star Trek—a mind meld is a telepathic link that Vulcans are able to create with other organisms. Mind Meld was released for sale on Shatner's website on November 6, 2001, coinciding with the release of the director's cut of Star Trek: The Motion Picture. Mind Meld attracted some notoriety because of an unintended sound in one scene that became a popular subject of flatulence humor among Star Trek fans and on morning zoo radio programs. Shatner denied being the source of this sound in multiple interviews; he and Mind Meld's director, Peter Jaysen, attributed it to equipment on set.

The film received mixed reviews from critics. Scott Brown of Entertainment Weekly gave the film an "F", and said that the only people likely to watch the film were extreme Star Trek fans and people interested in hearing Shatner's supposed flatulence. Laurence Lerman of Video Business praised the film for not "rehash[ing] anecdotes that have long been staples of Star Trek conventions and behind-the-scenes memoirs", and instead for dealing with such topics as alcoholism, career difficulties, and conflicts on the set of Star Trek.

== Contents ==
William Shatner and Leonard Nimoy respectively portrayed James T. Kirk and Spock in Star Trek, first in the 1960s television series (later retitled Star Trek: The Original Series), then in the 1970s television series Star Trek: The Animated Series, and subsequently in several Star Trek films between 1979 and 1994. In Mind Meld, they discuss the Star Trek media franchise and its enduring success. The film is, except for the title sequence, composed entirely of Shatner and Nimoy in conversation. Many of the topics they discuss were inspired by online questions from fans. The film starts in Nimoy's backyard, where the two sit on patio chairs, and then moves into Nimoy's library, which is filled with souvenirs.

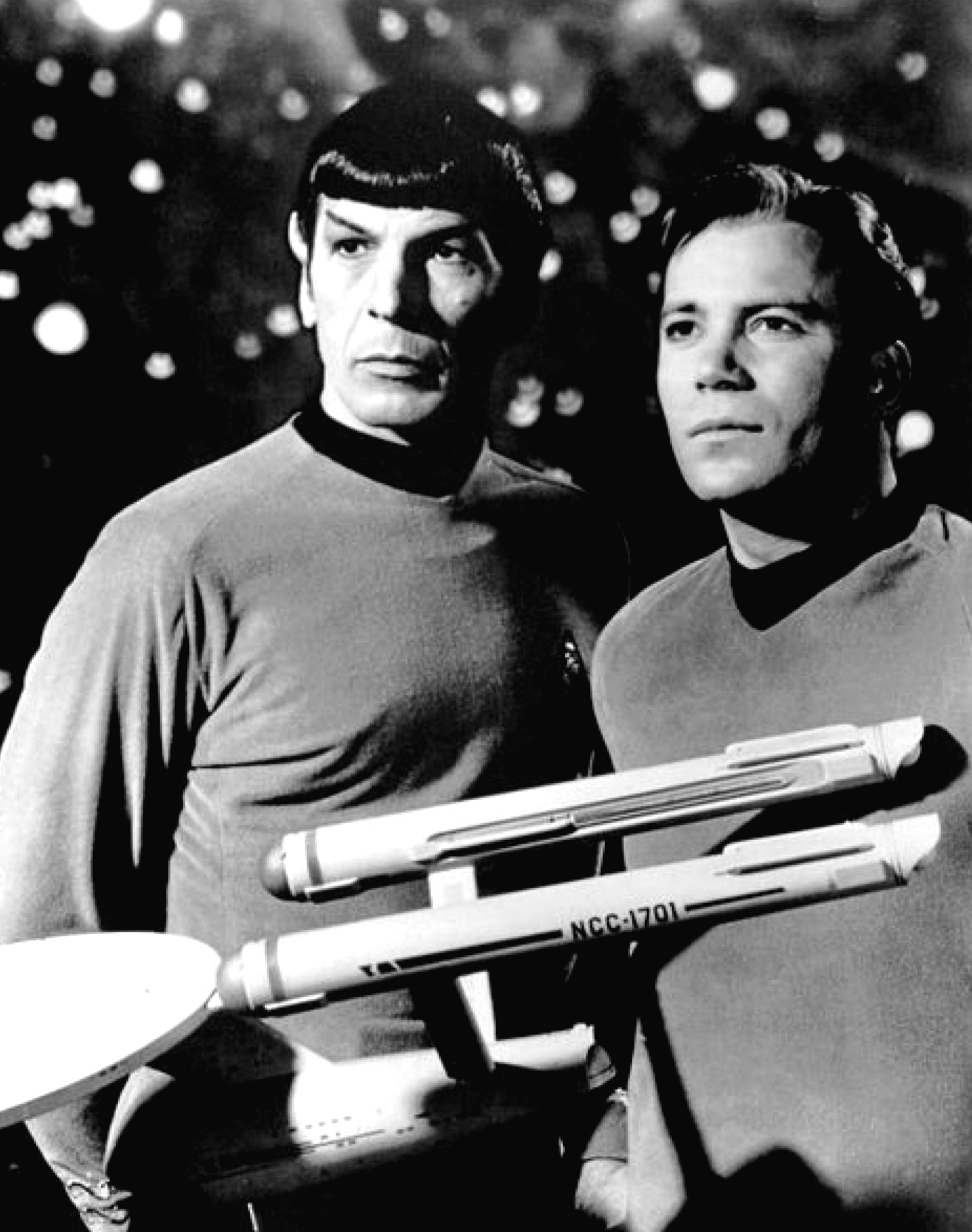
Nimoy (left) and Shatner as Spock and James T. Kirk in 1968, during production of Star Trek: The Original Series. In Mind Meld, Nimoy describes being an alcoholic at that time, and Shatner claims to have had sexual liaisons with Star Trek actresses.

The film focuses on the effects Star Trek had on the lives of Shatner and Nimoy, with each actor interviewing the other about his fame. They talk about Star Trek's origins and the death of DeForest Kelley, who had portrayed Leonard McCoy in both The Original Series and The Animated Series. Shatner and Nimoy also discuss interactions between themselves and others on the set of Star Trek, including conflicts. Both Shatner and Nimoy describe having had strained relationships with Gene Roddenberry, the creator of Star Trek, and attest to other members of the Original Series cast disliking Shatner. Only one of these cast members is referred to by name: Nichelle Nichols, who portrayed Nyota Uhura. "I never fully comprehended what it was that was bothering them", says Shatner.

Both men describe Star Trek as having put personal pressures on them that negatively affected their family lives. The conversation is mostly guided by Shatner, who prompts Nimoy to discuss issues he had regarding the legitimacy of consistently portraying an extraterrestrial, and other struggles with his acting career at the time. "It took me a while," Nimoy says, "but I got rid of all that anger when I realized that I never had to worry about work ever since Star Trek went on the air." Nimoy reveals that he was an alcoholic at the time of the original Star Trek series—something that was not publicly known before Mind Meld. He developed "a major drinking habit, probably during the second or third year" of the series, he says, and had his secretary bring him alcohol in paper cups at the end of each day of filming. Nimoy suggests that he became dependent on alcohol because of the deterioration of his marriage to Sandra Zober, his first wife. He says that, since divorcing Zober in 1987 and marrying actress Susan Bay in 1988, he has been a teetotaler.

Shatner says that acting in Star Trek was "life-consuming" and left him "barely any time for family", and that this was the reason for his divorce from Gloria Rand, his first wife. He describes a subsequent succession of sexual partners, including, he says, Star Trek actresses. He also talks about the death of his father, Joseph Shatner, and of his third wife, Nerine Kidd, who accidentally drowned in a pool in 1999, losing a battle with alcoholism. Shatner recalls that Nimoy had expressed concern about Kidd's alcoholism and warned him about marrying her. Another topic is Nimoy's fine-art photography, which deals with spirituality and sensuality. Both Shatner and Nimoy say that, while they are glad that Star Trek became successful, they wish their subsequent fame had encroached less on their privacy. They also describe having been typecast as a result of their roles in Star Trek, and say that this has had repercussions on their respective acting careers. Shatner recounts his initial surprise that, at science fiction conventions, the fans seem to like each other more than they like the science fiction actors. The film concludes with Nimoy putting his arm around Shatner's shoulder and saying, "You're my best friend."

== Production ==
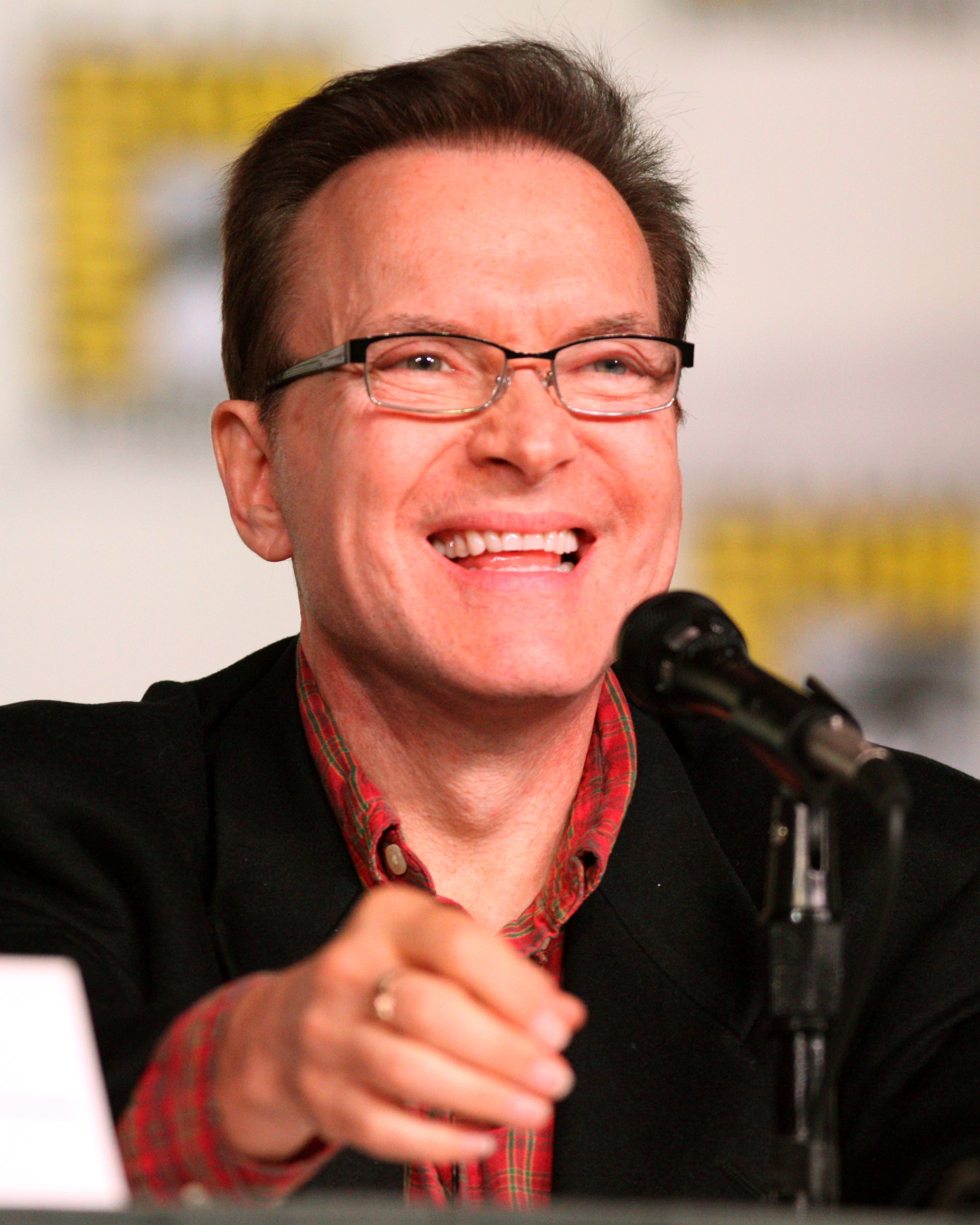
Voice actor Billy West narrated Mind Meld's title sequence.

Mind Meld was produced as a way of advertising Shatner's personal website, williamshatner.com, which offered features including the Shatner and Friends fan club's quarterly newsletter, semi-regular updates on Shatner's life, and a photograph of Shatner with the gorilla Koko. Shatner said that another reason they decided to make the film was because Nimoy was visibly getting old. (Note: Shatner is older than Nimoy by four days, with both born in 1931.) Shatner asked Nimoy if he would be willing to discuss his experiences with alcoholism in the film, and Nimoy agreed. Nimoy later said that no one had ever asked him about this part of his past, and that discussing it in Mind Meld "was an opportunity to put out some information that might be helpful to some people."

Filming took place on September 5, 2001, in high-definition video at Nimoy's home, under the direction of Peter Jaysen. There was no script; the conversation between Shatner and Nimoy was ad lib. The title sequence of Mind Meld is narrated by veteran voice actor Billy West, who had previously voiced such characters as Zim in the television series Invader Zim, Ralph in Joe's Apartment, and Elmer Fudd in Looney Tunes: Back in Action. While the filming session resulted in approximately two hours of footage, a significant portion of this was not used, resulting in a final runtime of 75 minutes. In an interview with science fiction magazine Starlog, Shatner said, "I don't think... that anything was cut because it was too personal or inflammatory. Edits were only made for time." The title of the film refers to a fictional practice in Star Trek; a mind meld is a telepathic link that Spock is able to create with other organisms because he is part Vulcan. Shatner summarized the film as being "two friends talking one-on-one".

== Release ==
Mind Meld was released on VHS and DVD for sale on Shatner's website on November 6, 2001, coinciding with the release of the director's cut of Star Trek: The Motion Picture, a film that Shatner and Nimoy agreed was not as good as they had hoped it would be. (Note: Other films involving Shatner were nearing their release dates at the time; he acted in Showtime and Shoot or Be Shot, and directed Groom Lake.) Mind Meld was produced by Creative Light Entertainment, a company that produced another filmed interview the following year—Stan Lee's Mutants, Monsters & Marvels, an interview of Marvel Comics publisher Stan Lee by film director Kevin Smith. The Mind Meld DVD offers widescreen and fullscreen options, Dolby Digital surround sound, and a five-minute "making of" featurette. Mind Meld T-shirts were available on Shatner's website. The film's release prompted Wil Wheaton, who had portrayed Wesley Crusher in Star Trek: The Next Generation, to change the name of his comic science fiction improvisational theatre company from "Mind Meld" to "EarnestBorg9".

Shatner referred to The Original Series as "cartoonish" in Mind Meld, but later, upon questioning by a reporter, said, "I never thought it was a cartoon ... I never thought it was beneath me." In a February 2002 interview on Larry King Live, Shatner said Mind Meld was similar to My Dinner with Andre, and indicated that he and Nimoy were hoping to produce more films of a similar nature. Nimoy said of the film, "This is the most personal insight the fans will get into our relationship and into aspects of Bill and myself they've never heard before." In April 2002, Mind Meld was screened at the Newport Beach Film Festival. Two years later, Mind Meld was included in the bonus material when the first six Star Trek films were re-released as a special edition box set.

=== Alleged flatulence ===
The contentious sound
An interview clip containing the sound audible around 52:47 as Shatner says "like"

Around 52 minutes and 47 seconds into the film, when Shatner is talking about the other Original Series actors disliking him, he shifts in his chair and a sound evocative of flatulence is audible. This sound, apparently unnoticed by the filmmakers, was first mentioned in the media by Adam Buckman in the New York Post on October 10, 2001. Buckman wrote that he played the sound for more than six colleagues who all agreed that it came from Shatner. This scene became a popular subject of flatulence humor among Star Trek fans and on morning zoo radio programs. Reviewers identified as many as six other similar noises in Mind Meld, between the 52-minute mark and the end.

Howard Stern played the sound on his radio show several times, including when Shatner appeared on the show to promote his upcoming television series Iron Chef USA on November 13, 2001. When Stern asked about the sound, Shatner said it had been produced by the boom operator. A similar claim was made on Shatner's website, where the noise was attributed to a squeaky jib. On Conan O'Brien's Late Night program on November 14, Shatner called it "outrageous" that Buckman should assume him to be the source of the sound rather than Nimoy. O'Brien responded, "You're the captain! You outrank him! It's your responsibility!" Pressed further by O'Brien on the sound's provenance, Shatner suggested that it may have been a dog bark or a bird call. According to Jaysen, the sound did not emanate from Shatner, and was most likely caused by cables rubbing against each other while a camera moved. "It was probably some machine that nobody heard", Shatner said in a September 2002 interview. "The controversy is over."

Jim Dawson devoted an entire chapter of his 2006 Modern History of the Fart to Shatner's alleged flatulence in Mind Meld, which he compares to the sound of someone stepping on a tribble. (Note: This is a Star Trek in-joke; in the Star Trek universe, tribbles are small, hairy extraterrestrials that reproduce rapidly.) G. Noel Gross of DVD Talk compared the excitement over this sound to that evinced by adolescent boys watching pornography, and compared the level of scrutiny devoted to the scene to that received by the Zapruder film.

== Reception ==
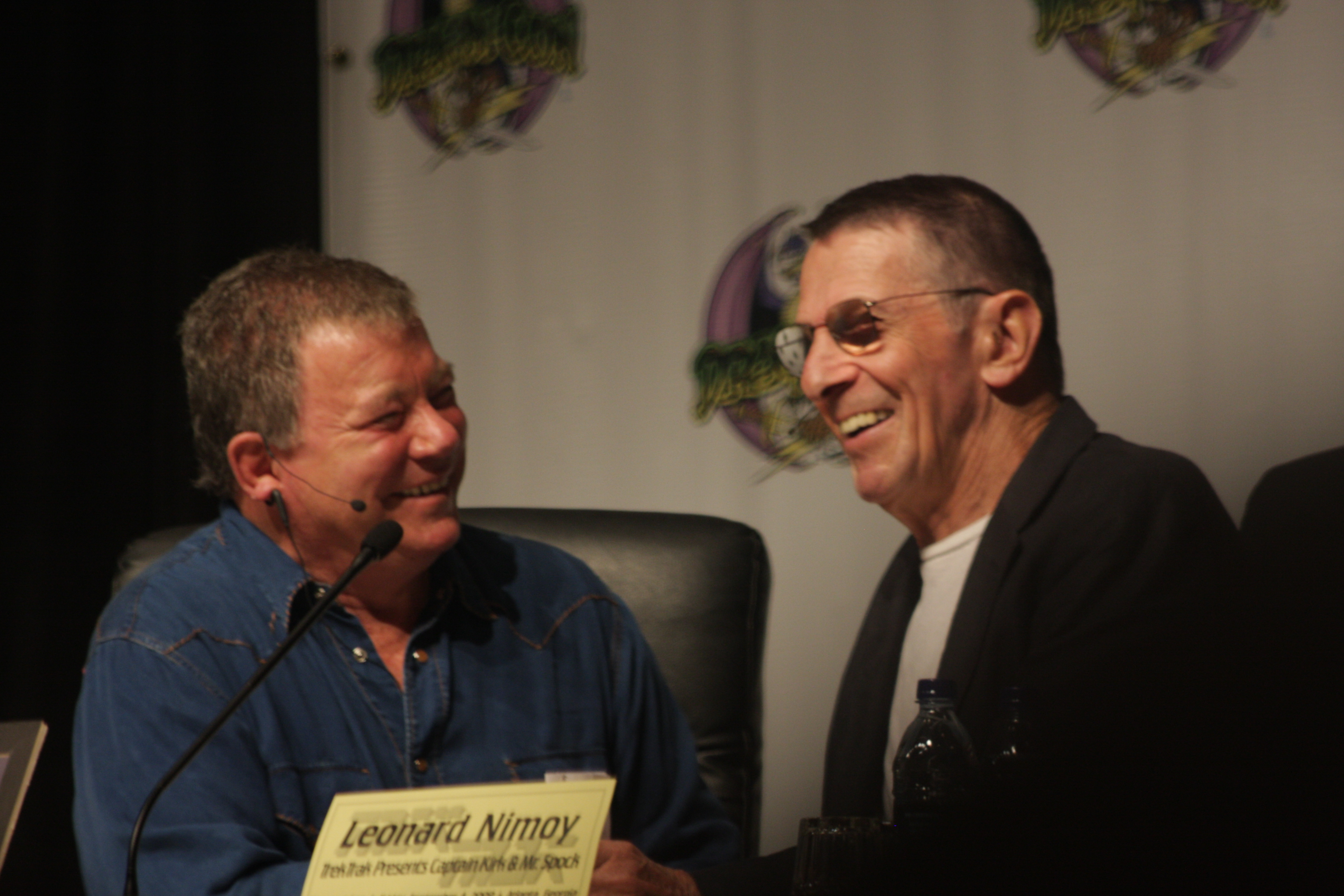
In his review of Mind Meld, Mike Clark of USA Today called the discussion between Shatner (left) and Nimoy (right) "surprisingly frank".

Sarah Sloboda of The New York Times wrote that Mind Meld "provides a genuine glimpse of the lives of the stars shadowed by the roles that defined their public personas, and the mutual experience that binds them as friends". Gross praised the video quality, but criticized the DVD functionality and features. He also wrote that "even in the heavier parts of this conversation, there's a warmth and comradery there that's rife with good humor". Scott Brown of Entertainment Weekly gave the film an F, saying that the only people likely to watch the film other than extreme Star Trek fans are people interested in hearing the sound alleged to be Shatner's flatulence, which Brown said can be clearly heard. He called the film "seemingly interminable" and said the discussion between Shatner and Nimoy shows that they "rival black holes in sheer self-absorption". According to John Henzell, writing for The Press of New Zealand, Mind Meld's trailer took its subject matter so seriously that it became comical.

Vern Perry of the Orange County Register called the film fascinating, writing that it skilfully combined humor and earnestness. He wrote that it was moving to see the two actors talk about their personal lives with such vulnerability—particularly when Nimoy discusses his experiences with alcoholism. Greg Stacy of OC Weekly reported being "thoroughly charmed" by the film, and called "the affection between [Shatner and Nimoy] obvious and touching."

Laurence Lerman of Video Business praised Mind Meld for not "rehash[ing] anecdotes that have long been staples of Star Trek conventions and behind-the-scenes memoirs", but instead dealing with such topics as alcoholism, career difficulties, and conflicts on the set of Star Trek. Mike Clark of USA Today praised Shatner's interviewing abilities and wrote that the film was engaging. Clark called Shatner's and Nimoy's conversation "surprisingly frank", but added that Shatner was "full of himself". A review in British newspaper The Guardian summarized Mind Meld as "a couple of gents sitting around talking".

== Bibliography ==
- Dawson, Jim (2006). Blame It on the Dog: A Modern History of the Fart. Berkeley, California: Ten Speed Press. ISBN 1580087515.
- Greenberger, Robert (2012). Star Trek: The Complete Unauthorized History. London: Quarto Group. ISBN 978-1610586894.
- Lawson, Tim; Persons, Alisa (2004). The Magic Behind the Voices: A Who's Who of Cartoon Voice Actors. Jackson, Mississippi: University Press of Mississippi. ISBN 1578066964.
- Robinson, Peter N.; Bauer, Sebastian (2011). Introduction to Bio-Ontologies. Boca Raton, Florida: CRC Press. ISBN 978-1439836668.
- Terrace, Vincent (2011). Encyclopedia of Television Shows, 1925 through 2010 (2 ed.). Jefferson, North Carolina: McFarland & Company. ISBN 978-0786486410.
- Wheaton, Wil (2004). Just a Geek: Unflinchingly Honest Tales of the Search for Life, Love, and Fulfillment Beyond the Starship Enterprise. Sebastopol, California: O'Reilly Media. ISBN 0596555571.
