= Soup of the Day =

- DVD cover
- Created by: Iron Sink
- Directed by: Scott Zakarin
- Country of origin: United States
- No. of episodes: 19

Production
- Running time: 19 episodes, 3–8 min. in length

Original release
- Network: YouTube; Break.com
- Release: May 2006 – July 2006

Soup of the Day was a loosely scripted 2006 web series about a man dating three women at the same time. It consisted of 19 self-contained episodes, and was later released on DVD as a full-length movie.

== Background ==
Soup of the Day debuted in May 2006. Its episodes varied from 3 to 8 minutes in length, and were posted on each Monday, Wednesday, and Friday to video sites including YouTube and Break.com. At times episodes were posted only hours after editing was completed.

The 19 episodes reportedly received a total of over 6 million views as of October 2006.

As the story unfolded online, the audience was encouraged to interact with Brandon on MySpace. The character maintained a real-time profile page at MySpace, and received advice from viewers as to which girl he should pick, which could influence the plot. This interactive element of the series came from director Scott Zakarin, creator of the internet's first episodic series The Spot in 1995.

The entire series was originally viewable at SoupMovie.com, but was later revised to simply direct users to where they can buy the series on DVD. The DVD was released in February 2007 by Echo Bridge Home Entertainment, and features the original 19 episodes, a re-cut film-length version of the series, and hours of bonus materials including bloopers, deleted scenes, filmmaker commentary, cast interviews, and an alternate ending.

== Plot ==
Brandon Craig is a man who is dating three women at the same time. He met all three girls in one night. One is his boss, Monique, and she will destroy his career if he breaks up with her. Another is Wendy, a tough undercover cop, who will beat him up if he breaks up with her. The third is Franki, the host of Missileblast (a parody of Rocketboom), who is a manic depressant who will act upon her suicidal tendencies if Brandon breaks up with her.

== Cast ==
- Jon Crowley – Brandon Craig
- Catherine Reitman – Monique
- Patty Wortham – Wendy
- Tina Molina – Franki
- Brian Palermo – Todd
- Rob Cesternino – Himself
- Levin O'Connor – Dr. Mitch

== Trivia ==
- Soup of the Day contains cameos by a number of different stars from reality television, including small roles from stars from Survivor, The Amazing Race, Big Brother and The Real World
- The lead character, Brandon, is named after Brandon Tartikoff who was the mentor of the film's director, Scott Zakarin
- In Episode 7, the character Franki is shown at her job on "Missileblast" which is a parody of Rocketboom. In the episode Franki was revealed to be taking orders from demanding producers and ultimately decides to leave her show. Several months later some speculated that it was a case of life imitating art when Amanda Congdon similarly left Rocketboom after an argument with her own behind-the-scenes producer.
- Monique is played by Catherine Reitman who is the daughter of Hollywood producer and director Ivan Reitman.
