= Comic Book: The Movie =

- DVD cover
- Directed by: Mark Hamill
- Written by: Mark Hamill; Billy West
- Produced by: Mark Hamill; Jess Harnell; Eric Mittleman; Roger Rose; Billy West; Scott Zakarin
- Starring: Mark Hamill; Billy West; Donna D'Errico; Roger Rose; Jess Harnell
- Narrated by: Mark Hamill
- Cinematography: Jason Cooley
- Edited by: Matt Mariska; Nimrod Erez; Lawrence Hutchins; E.S. Josephs
- Music by: Billy West
- Production companies: Creative Light Entertainment; Timely Studios
- Distributed by: Miramax Home Entertainment
- Release date: January 27, 2004
- Running time: 106 minutes
- Country: United States
- Language: English

Comic Book: The Movie is a 2004 direct-to-DVD mockumentary starring, co-written and directed by Mark Hamill.

This film features various voice actors appearing in a live-action film and also marked Sid Caesar's final film role before retiring in 2005 and dying in 2014.

== Plot ==
Comic book fan Donald "Don" Swan battles against a fictional film studio that is about to announce a film based on his favorite superhero, Commander Courage (a parody of Batman).

== Cast ==
- Mark Hamill as Donald Swan
- Billy West as Leo Matuzik
- Donna D'Errico as Liberty Lass, Papaya Smith
- Roger Rose as Taylor Donohue
- Jess Harnell as Ricky
- Lori Alan as Anita Levine
- Daran Norris as Commander Courage, Bruce Easly
- Jim Cummings as Dr. Cedric Perview
- Jill Talley as Jill Sprang
- Tara Strong as Hotel Maid
- Arleen Sorkin as Ms. Q
- James Arnold Taylor as J.T.
- Debi Derryberry as Debby Newman
- Tom Kenny as Derek Sprang
- Sid Caesar as Old Army Buddy
- Jonathan Winters as Wally (Army Buddy #2)
- Kevin Michael Richardson as Ice Tray

=== Cameo appearances in the film ===
- Kevin Smith
- Hugh Hefner
- Stan Lee
- Bruce Campbell
- Peter David
- David Prowse
- Peter Mayhew
- Ron Perlman
- Jeremy Bulloch
- Mike Mignola
- Matt Groening
- Rob Paulsen
- Sergio Aragonés
- Maurice LaMarche
- Bruce Timm
- Roy Thomas

== Production ==
The script was finished on July 29, 2002. Most of the movie was filmed at the 35th annual San Diego Comic-Con on August 1–4, 2002. All the interviews with attendees while Hamill remained in character were unscripted to obtain a realistic look. This film subverted convention by casting voice actors in live-action roles. The panel was held on August 2, 2002.

== Home media release ==
Comic Book: The Movie was originally released on DVD on January 27, 2004. It was distributed by Miramax Home Entertainment and Buena Vista Home Entertainment. It was distributed internationally through NFK Entertainment UK and Force Entertainment (Australia) on September 13, 2005. It was distributed by Alliance Films on April 26, 2011 in Canada. It was re-released on DVD and distributed by Paramount Movies on July 13, 2021. Netflix made it available for streaming November 27, 2013 – June 2, 2016.

== Reception ==
The film received an approval rating of 40% on review aggregator Rotten Tomatoes, based on five reviews. IGN rated the film a 7 out of 10.

== Awards ==
- DVD Exclusive Awards
  - Best Live-Action DVD Premiere Movie
  - Best Supporting Actor (in a DVD Premiere Movie) - Sid Caesar and Jonathan Winters
  - Nominee - Best Actor (in a DVD Premiere Movie) - Mark Hamill
  - Nominee - Best Director (in a DVD Premiere Movie) - Mark Hamill
