= Eon-4 =

Science fiction web series

- Rear View of the S'echayaa(sp)
- Genre: Science fiction Soap opera
- Created by: Rockne S. O'Bannon
- Country of origin: United States
- Original language: English

Production
- Production company: American Cybercast

Original release
- Release: 1996 – 1997

EON-4 was the first sci-fi web series and the second web series from American Cybercast. The series, created by Rockne S. O'Bannon (Creator of Alien Nation, seaQuest DSV, and Farscape) was based around the mysterious Groom Lake or Area 51 site as the point of contact with an alien race. Three explorers from earth, U.S. Navy Captain David M. Crocker, Russian Alona Renee Kalinova, and John Eric Lange were allowed visitation (as EXPLRR TM I) with these aliens known as the Sentients, but were soon involved in a political intrigue on the alien world. Crocker dies on the trip to the Sentients contact point on Mars.

The series website (Producers, Scott Nourse, Eric Barnard. Creative Director, Josh S. Rose) was designed as a direct transmission from the explorers as a way for visitors to interact with the drama unfolding before them. Each day, several images and a bit of the story were presented documenting the experience (in a sort of "static laden transmission") form. Often details would be kept obscure to heighten the sense of mystery. Imagery for EON-4 was created by compositing still photography over 3D rendered graphics and adding various effects.

The creators of EON-4 implemented a BBS for direct dialogue between the creators and audience. Another board was set up where fans engaged in roleplaying within the storyline.

The web series lasted for little over a year and despite having gained the sponsorship of Apple, Toyota and Visa (New York Times), it ended shortly after the bankruptcy of its production company American Cybercast, producers of the first web episodic, The Spot.

After the demise of American Cybercast, a number of Eon-4 fans set up another interactive episodic story, called Marsdawn.
