= Creating Rem Lezar =

1989 film by Scott Zakarin

- VHS cover
- Directed by: Scott Zakarin
- Written by: Sean P. Kebel
- Produced by: Scott Zakarin; Phil Meyerowitz
- Starring: Jack Mulcahy; Courtney Kernaghan; Jonathan Goch
- Cinematography: Richard E. Brooks
- Music by: James E. Graseck; Bernie Maloney; Mark Mulé; Peter Spirer
- Production company: Rem Lezar Corporation
- Distributed by: Valley Studios
- Release date: 1989
- Running time: 48 minutes
- Country: United States
- Language: English

Creating Rem Lezar /ˈrɛm ləˈzɑːr/ is a 1989 American children's musical film directed, written, and produced by Scott Zakarin and was released direct-to-video.

== Plot ==
Two children have the same dream about the same imaginary friend, a superhero named Rem Lezar. They build a mannequin to look like their dream hero, which comes to life. However, he doesn't have his Quixotic Medallion, which he needs to live longer than a day. They are taunted by the evil Vorock, a floating entity who threatens them from the sky, who has hidden the Medallion "at the highest point that the mind can go". The group travels to New York City in search of the Medallion. They meet various characters along the way, such as a dancing quartet who sing to themselves, and visit landmarks like Central Park and the Twin Towers. When they fail to find the Medallion, they return to Vorock, and are able to turn him good by telling him that they love him. The children go back home and find that Rem Lezar has returned to the form of a mannequin, but Zack still has the Quixotic Medallion. The children go back to sleep and dream of Rem Lezar.

== Cast ==
- Jack Mulcahy as Rem Lezar, policeman
- Courtney Kernaghan as Ashlee
  - Allegra Forste as Ashlee (singing double)
- Jonathan Goch as Zack
- Kathleen Gati as Ashlee's mother
- Scott Zakarin as Vorock
- Stewart H. Bruck as Principal
- Evan Abbey, Ed Luparello, Billy Manning, and Johnny O'Hanlon as park quartet
- Devery Gladney as park rapper
- James E. Graseck as park violinist
- Teresa Simpson as school teacher
- Stuart Grodin as Ashlee's father
- Karin Kernaghan as Zack's mother
- Thomas Ritchie as Zack's father
- Jason Erdman as Ashlee's brother

== Production ==
Creating Rem Lezar was filmed in a variety of locations in New York state: The Bellmores, New York City, Roslyn and Spring Glen.

It was also shot on 16 mm film.

== Reception and legacy ==
In 2005, the film came to prominence on the website eBaum's World, with the musical number "Day and Night" (featuring a late-1980s doo-wop group, hip-hop MC and violinist) becoming a viral hit.

Creating Rem Lezar (described as "creepy/fascinating" and "very strange") appeared in a 2014 BuzzFeed listicle of 26 films that Scarecrow Video were trying to keep available to the public, as a reminder of "how many rare titles are still only available as physical media thanks to market forces, rights issues, corporate wrangling, and other reasons."

Courtney Kernaghan, the actress who played Ashlee, died in 2017 at the age of 40.

Creating Rem Lezar was featured on a 2019 episode of RedLetterMedia's "Best of the Worst" series. The crew voted the film the best video they had watched that night, and have since made it part of their Best of the Worst Hall of Fame.

Scott Zakarin, the film's director, has himself described the film as "a critical success but a commercial failure."

The character of Rem Lezar became incredibly popular with twitch streamer Vinesauce and his online audience, which led to the streamer conducting an interview with the character's actor Jack Mulcahy about the film on August 30, 2022.

RiffTrax, consisting of former Mystery Science Theater 3000 alumni Kevin Murphy, Bill Corbett and Michael J. Nelson, commented on the film March 22, 2024.

== Home media ==
In 2022, the film was remastered from the original 1-inch master tape and released on DVD and Blu-ray for the first time on September 13, 2022, commemorating the film's 35th anniversary.

== Adaptations ==
Creating Rem Lezar was adapted for the stage on the Winnipeg Fringe Festival (2022).
