= Cadillac Man =

1990 US comedy film by Roger Donaldson

- Theatrical release poster
- Directed by: Roger Donaldson
- Written by: Ken Friedman
- Produced by: Roger Donaldson; Charles Roven
- Starring: Robin Williams; Tim Robbins; Pamela Reed; Fran Drescher
- Cinematography: David Gribble
- Edited by: Richard Francis-Bruce
- Music by: J. Peter Robinson
- Distributed by: Orion Pictures
- Release date: May 18, 1990
- Running time: 97 minutes
- Country: United States
- Language: English
- Budget: $15 million
- Box office: $27.6 million (US)

Cadillac Man is a 1990 American black comedy film directed by Roger Donaldson, starring Robin Williams and Tim Robbins. The plot of the film centers on car salesman Joey O'Brien (Williams), whose life is consumed by turmoil, which all comes to a head when his dealership is taken hostage by Larry (Robbins), a love-crazed motorcyclist.

The film received mixed reviews from critics, and grossed $27.6 million against its $15 million budget.

== Plot ==
Queens car salesman Joey O'Brien must deal with the ever-increasing pressures in his life: his ex-wife Tina is demanding alimony, his daughter Lisa is missing, his married mistress Joy Munchack and his single mistress Lila are both desperately in love with him, and he has a two-day deadline to either sell twelve cars or lose his job. In addition, he has an outstanding loan from Mafia don Tony DiPino; a loan that he must either quickly repay or lose his life.

On the day of the big dealership car sale (and the final day of O'Brien's deadline), the car dealership is taken hostage by Larry Kosciuski, a motorcyclist toting an AK-47 who believes that his wife Donna is cheating on him. Joey manages to talk Larry out of doing any harm, by claiming that he is the one who is sleeping with Donna. As police surround the dealership, Joey and Larry begin to bond, and Joey convinces Larry to give himself up.

Not realizing that Larry's gun is not loaded, the police wound him after most of the hostages have already been released. Joey promises to remain with him while he recovers, and confesses that he had never actually slept with Donna. The crisis resolves all of Joey's problems: Joy and Lila learn of each other and dump him, Lisa returns, his job is secure, Tony (whose son Frankie was among the hostages) forgives his debt, and he begins to reconcile with Tina.

== Cast ==
- Robin Williams as Joey O'Brien
- Tim Robbins as Larry Kosciuski
- Pamela Reed as Tina O'Brien
- Annabella Sciorra as Donna Kosciuski
- Fran Drescher as Joy Munchack
- Zack Norman as Harry Munchack
- Lori Petty as Lila
- Paul Guilfoyle as Jack "Little Jack" Turgeon
- Bill Nelson as Jack "Big Jack" Turgeon
- Eddie Jones as Benny
- Mimi Cecchini as Ma
- Tristine Skyler as Lisa O'Brien
- Judith Hoag as Molly
- Lauren Tom as Dim sum Waitress
- Anthony Powers as Captain Mason
- Bill Nunn as Grave Digger
- Paul Herman as Tony DiPino
- Erik King as Davey
- Richard Panebianco as Frankie DiPino
- Gary Howard Klar as Detective Walters
- Elaine Stritch as Widow
- Jack Mulcahy as S.W.A.T. Team Officer

== Production ==
To prepare for his role in the film, Robin Williams spent time in car dealerships in Queens, New York.

== Release ==
The film opened at number 2 at the box office on May 18, 1990, behind Bird on a Wire. Its total worldwide gross was $27,627,310.

== Reception ==
On Rotten Tomatoes, the film has an approval rating of 62%, based on 13 reviews. Metacritic gives it a score of 50 out of 100, based on 21 critic reviews. Audiences surveyed by CinemaScore gave the film a "B−" grade on scale of A+ to F.

Chicago Sun-Times critic, Roger Ebert, had mixed feelings about the film, giving it a two stars out of four, stating, "My problems with Cadillac Man were probably inspired more by false expectations than by anything on the screen, and maybe if Robbins had come crashing in through the window in the first scene I would have liked it more." Variety thought that the film had "the distinction of being the loudest film of 1990 and one of the worst".
