= Comic Book Superheroes Unmasked =

2003 television documentary

Comic Book Superheroes Unmasked is a television documentary that aired on The History Channel in 2003. The film is about the history of the American comic book industry from its origins in the 1930s to the present day, and how comic books have mirrored and affected the society around them. It featured traditional historians, people from inside the industry such as Stan Lee, and people who grew up reading comic books.

People featured in the documentary included Frank Miller, Denny O'Neil, Jim Steranko, Michael Chabon, Will Eisner, Kevin Smith, Neil Gaiman, Avi Arad, Joe Quesada, Paul Levitz, Mike Richardson, Stan and Joan Lee, and Bradford Wright. Keith David also appears as the narrator.
