= List of celebrities appearing on Entourage =

In several episodes of the HBO original series, Entourage, celebrities, including actors, authors, musicians and athletes, have lent their celebrity to the show, playing themselves. However, in most cases, many aspects of their life are fictionalized. The following is a list of such appearances.

== Season 1 (2004) ==
Episode	Celebrity
#1 Entourage (Pilot)	Mark Wahlberg
#1 Entourage (Pilot)	Ali Larter
#2 The Review	David Faustino
#2 The Review	Jessica Alba
#2 The Review	Leighton Meester
#3 Talk Show	Jimmy Kimmel
#3 Talk Show	Evander Holyfield (uncredited)
#3 Talk Show	Vitali Klitschko (uncredited)
#3 Talk Show	Lennox Lewis (uncredited)
#3 Talk Show	Sarah Silverman
#3 Talk Show	Luke Wilson
#3 Talk Show	Sara Foster
#4 Date Night	Big Boy
#4 Date Night	Leighton Meester
#5 The Script and the Sherpa	Val Kilmer
#6 Busey and the Beach	Gary Busey
#8 New York	Larry David
#8 New York	Scarlett Johansson

== Season 2 (2005) ==
Episode	Celebrity
#1 The Boys Are Back in Town	Gary Busey
#1 The Boys Are Back in Town	Amanda Peet (uncredited)
#2 My Maserati Does 185	Lamar Odom
#2 My Maserati Does 185	Jaime Pressly
#2 My Maserati Does 185	Holly Valance
#3 Aquamansion	Ralph Macchio
#3 Aquamansion	Hugh Hefner
#3 Aquamansion	Danny Masterson
#3 Aquamansion	Holly Madison (uncredited)
#3 Aquamansion	Kendra Wilkinson (uncredited)
#3 Aquamansion	Bridget Marquardt (uncredited)
#3 Aquamansion	Pauly Shore
#4 An Offer Refused	Chris Penn
#5 Neighbors	Anthony Anderson
#5 Neighbors	Bob Saget
#6 Chinatown	Michael Buffer
#7 The Sundance Kids	James Cameron
#7 The Sundance Kids	Peter Dinklage
#8 Oh, Mandy	Mandy Moore
#8 Oh, Mandy	Joyce Brothers
#9 I Love You Too	Vanessa Angel
#9 I Love You Too	Jesse Jane
#9 I Love You Too	Devon
#9 I Love You Too	Mandy Moore
#9 I Love You Too	Bono & U2 (uncredited)
#10 The Bat Mitzvah	James Cameron
#10 The Bat Mitzvah	Melinda Clarke
#10 The Bat Mitzvah	DJ Quik
#10 The Bat Mitzvah	Mandy Moore
#11 Blue Balls Lagoon	Brooke Shields
#11 Blue Balls Lagoon	Mandy Moore
#12 Good Morning, Saigon	Saigon
#13 Exodus	Mandy Moore
#14 The Abyss	Saigon
#14 The Abyss	Richard Schiff
#14 The Abyss	Pauly Shore
#14 The Abyss	James Cameron

== Season 3 (2006–2007) ==
Episode	Celebrity	Ref.
#1 Aquamom	Big Boy	
#1 Aquamom	James Woods	
#1 Aquamom	James Cameron	
#1 Aquamom	Maria Menounos	
#5 Crash and Burn	Paul Haggis	
#5 Crash and Burn	Penny Marshall	
#5 Crash and Burn	Saigon	
#7 Strange Days	Seth Green	
#7 Strange Days	Melinda Clarke	
#9 Vegas Baby, Vegas!	Seth Green	
#10 I Wanna Be Sedated	Saigon	
#10 I Wanna Be Sedated	Three 6 Mafia	
#11 What About Bob?	Edward Burns	
#11 What About Bob?	DJ AM	
#16 Gotcha!	Pauly Shore	
#16 Gotcha!	Chuck Liddell	
#16 Gotcha!	Bruce Buffer	
#17 Return of the King	Edward Burns	
#19 The Prince's Bride	Brett Ratner	
#19 The Prince's Bride	Marisa Miller	
#20 Adios Amigos	Monique Alexander	

== Season 4 (2007) ==
Episode	Celebrity
#1 Welcome to the Jungle	Stephen Gaghan
#2 The First Cut is the Deepest	Anthony Michael Hall
#3 Malibooty	Dennis Hopper
#3 Malibooty	Chuck Zito
#3 Malibooty	Mickey Jones
#4 Sorry, Harvey	M. Night Shyamalan
#5 The Dream Team	Snoop Dogg
#8 Gary's Desk	Gary Busey
#8 Gary's Desk	Mary J. Blige
#8 Gary's Desk	Peter Jackson
#8 Gary's Desk	Yvette Nicole Brown
#9 The Young and the Stoned	Anna Faris
#10 Snow Job	Anna Faris
#11 No Cannes Do	Anna Faris
#11 No Cannes Do	Sam Nazarian
#11 No Cannes Do	Sydney Pollack
#11 No Cannes Do	Kanye West
#12 The Cannes Kids	George Clooney (uncredited)
#12 The Cannes Kids	Angelina Jolie (uncredited)

== Season 5 (2008) ==
Episode	Celebrity
#1 Fantasy Island	Michael Phillips
#1 Fantasy Island	Richard Roeper
#1 Fantasy Island	Ben Silverman
#1 Fantasy Island	Ryan Eggold
#2 Unlike a Virgin	Mark Wahlberg
#2 Unlike a Virgin	Leighton Meester
#2 Unlike a Virgin	Tony Bennett
#3 The All Out Fall Out	T.I.
#4 Fire Sale	Whoopi Goldberg
#4 Fire Sale	Sherri Shepherd
#4 Fire Sale	Elisabeth Hasselbeck
#5 Tree Trippers	Eric Roberts
#5 Tree Trippers	Katie Morgan
#5 Tree Trippers	Shay Jordan
#5 Tree Trippers	Cassie Young
#6 ReDOMption	Phil Mickelson
#7 Gotta Look Up to Get Down	Jeffrey Tambor
#8 First Class Jerk	Jamie-Lynn Sigler
#8 First Class Jerk	Frank Darabont
#9 Pie	Jason Patric
#10 Seth Green Day	Seth Green
#11 Play'n with Fire	Jamie-Lynn Sigler
#11 Play'n with Fire	Peter Berg
#11 Play'n with Fire	Joy Bryant
#12 Return to Queens Blvd.	Jamie-Lynn Sigler
#12 Return to Queens Blvd.	Gus Van Sant
#12 Return to Queens Blvd.	Martin Scorsese
#12 Return to Queens Blvd.	Michael Phelps (uncredited)

== Season 6 (2009) ==
Episode	Celebrity
#1 Drive	Jay Leno
#1 Drive	Jamie-Lynn Sigler
#2 Amongst Friends	Jamie-Lynn Sigler
#2 Amongst Friends	Gal Gadot
#3 One Car, Two Car, Red Car, Blue Car	50 Cent
#3 One Car, Two Car, Red Car, Blue Car	Jamie-Lynn Sigler
#4 Running on E	David Schwimmer
#4 Running on E	Jamie-Lynn Sigler
#4 Running on E	Edward Burns
#5 Fore!	Jeffrey Tambor
#5 Fore!	Mark Wahlberg
#5 Fore!	Tom Brady
#5 Fore!	Jamie-Lynn Sigler
#6 Murphy's Lie	Jamie-Lynn Sigler
#6 Murphy's Lie	Steve Nash
#6 Murphy's Lie	Jimmy Shubert
#7 No More Drama	Jamie-Lynn Sigler
#7 No More Drama	Bob Saget
#8 The Sorkin Notes	Aaron Sorkin
#9 Security Briefs	Zac Efron
#9 Security Briefs	Frank Darabont
#10 Berried Alive	Jamie-Lynn Sigler
#11 Scared Straight	Jamie-Lynn Sigler
#11 Scared Straight	Melinda Clarke
#11 Scared Straight	David Faustino
#11 Scared Straight	Dean Cain
#12 Give a Little Bit	Matt Damon
#12 Give a Little Bit	Bono
#12 Give a Little Bit	LeBron James
#12 Give a Little Bit	Rich Paul
#12 Give a Little Bit	Jim Edmonds
#12 Give a Little Bit	Kenny Dichter
#12 Give a Little Bit	Jamie-Lynn Sigler

== Season 7 (2010) ==
Episode	Celebrity
#1 Stunted	Nick Cassavetes
#1 Stunted	Rick Salomon
#2 Buzzed	Nick Cassavetes
#2 Buzzed	Jerry Jones
#2 Buzzed	Maria Menounos
#2 Buzzed	Bob Saget
#3 Dramedy	Randall Wallace
#3 Dramedy	Adrian Peterson
#4 Tequila Sunrise	John Stamos
#4 Tequila Sunrise	Shawne Merriman
#4 Tequila Sunrise	Casey Wasserman
#4 Tequila Sunrise	Tom Sizemore
#4 Tequila Sunrise	Soo Yeon Lee
#4 Tequila Sunrise	Elmira Zainabudinova
#5 Bottoms Up	Sasha Grey
#5 Bottoms Up	Bob Saget
#5 Bottoms Up	Mike Tyson
#5 Bottoms Up	Jessica Simpson
#5 Bottoms Up	Aaron Sorkin
#5 Bottoms Up	Randall Wallace
#5 Bottoms Up	Stan Lee
#6 Hair	Sasha Grey
#7 Tequila and Coke	Sasha Grey
#7 Tequila and Coke	Chris Bosh
#7 Tequila and Coke	Randall Wallace
#7 Tequila and Coke	Lenny Kravitz
#7 Tequila and Coke	Mark Wahlberg
#7 Tequila and Coke	Sean Combs
#7 Tequila and Coke	Jerry Jones
#8 Sniff Sniff Gang Bang	Sasha Grey
#8 Sniff Sniff Gang Bang	Brent Bolthouse
#8 Sniff Sniff Gang Bang	Jeffrey Tambor
#8 Sniff Sniff Gang Bang	Kevin Love
#8 Sniff Sniff Gang Bang	Mark Cuban
#9 Porn Scenes from an Italian Restaurant	Sasha Grey
#9 Porn Scenes from an Italian Restaurant	Richard Branson (uncredited)
#9 Porn Scenes from an Italian Restaurant	Queen Latifah (as "Dana")
#9 Porn Scenes from an Italian Restaurant	Brian Urlacher
#9 Porn Scenes from an Italian Restaurant	Ethan Suplee
#9 Porn Scenes from an Italian Restaurant	Mark Cuban
#9 Porn Scenes from an Italian Restaurant	Peter Berg
#10 Lose Yourself	John Cleese
#10 Lose Yourself	Ryan Howard
#10 Lose Yourself	Sasha Grey
#10 Lose Yourself	Drew Brees
#10 Lose Yourself	Mark Cuban
#10 Lose Yourself	Christina Aguilera
#10 Lose Yourself	Eminem
#10 Lose Yourself	Royce Da 5'9
#10 Lose Yourself	Minka Kelly
#10 Lose Yourself	Jordan Farmar
#10 Lose Yourself	Kevin Love

== Season 8 (2011) ==
Episode	Celebrity
#1 Home Sweet Home	Johnny Galecki
#1 Home Sweet Home	Andrew Dice Clay
#2 Out with a Bang	Andrew Dice Clay
#2 Out with a Bang	Christian Slater
#3 One Last Shot	Andrew Dice Clay
#3 One Last Shot	Mark Cuban
#3 One Last Shot	Jamie Kennedy
#4 Whiz Kid	Bobby Flay
#5 Motherfucker	Melinda Clarke
#5 Motherfucker	Jamie Kennedy
#5 Motherfucker	Andrew Dice Clay
#6 The Big Bang	David Spade
#6 The Big Bang	Melinda Clarke
#6 The Big Bang	Bobby Flay
#6 The Big Bang	Johnny Galecki
#6 The Big Bang	Andrew Dice Clay
#6 The Big Bang	Scott Conant
#6 The Big Bang	Steve Tisch
#7 Second to Last	Mark Teixeira
#7 Second to Last	Melinda Clarke
#7 Second to Last	Johnny Galecki
#7 Second to Last	Amar'e Stoudemire
#7 Second to Last	Michael Strahan
#7 Second to Last	Alex Rodriguez
#7 Second to Last	Mark Cuban
#8 The End	Mike Ditka
#8 The End	Barry Alvarez
#8 The End	Rachel Zoe

== Fictional characters ==
The following is a list of known celebrities portraying a fictional character on the series, not including recurring characters.

Celebrity	Character	Season(s)	Episode(s)
April Scott	Model	1	Talk Show
Charlotte Ayanna	Joanne	1	Date night
Val Kilmer	The Sherpa	1	The Script and the Sherpa
Nadine Velazquez	Janeen	1	New York
Scarlett Chorvat	Carol	1	New York
Doug Ellin	The Director	1, 2, 6	New York; Oh, Mandy; Scared Straight; Give a Little Bit
Holly Valance	Leanna	2	My Maserati Does 185
Bai Ling	Li Lei	2	Chinatown
Matt Dallas	Male Model	2	Chinatown
Sarah Carter	Cassie	2	The Sundance Kids
Dale Dye	Scuba Instructor	2	Oh, Mandy
Chad Muska	Surfer	2	Oh, Mandy
Rainn Wilson	R.J. Spencer	2	I Love You Too
Anna Maria Horsford	Saigon's Mother	2, 3	Good Morning, Saigon; I Wanna Be Sedated
Mercedes Ruehl	Mrs. Chase	3, 5	Aquamom, Return to Queens Blvd.
Amanda Righetti	Jewelry Store Clerk	3	Aquamom
Malin Akerman	Tori	3	Three's Company, Strange Days
Cameron Richardson	Lindsay	3	Strange Days
Ken Jeong	Coffee Shop Manager	3	The Release
David Paymer	Sammy Kane	3	I Wanna Be Sedated
Lindsay Sloane	Nicole	3	I Wanna Be Sedated
Dante Basco	Jimmy/Fukijama	3	What About Bob?
Brian Tee	Jimmy's Bodyguard	3	What About Bob?
Will Sasso	Jay Lester	3	Dog Day Afternoon
Artie Lange	Scott Segil/Ari's Fraternity Brother	3	Gotcha!
Leslie Bibb	Laurie/Scott's Fiancee	3	Gotcha!
Michael Lerner	Joe Roberts	3	The Resurrection
Dan Castellaneta	Andrew Preston	4	The First Cut is the Deepest
Lisa Rinna	Donna Devaney	4	Malibooty
Mini Andén	Samantha	4	Malibooty
Stephen Tobolowsky	Mayor of Beverly Hills	4	Sorry, Harvey
Bob Balaban	Doctor	4	The Dream Team
Louis Lombardi	Cousin Ronnie	4, 5, 6	The WeHo Ho, Return to Queens Blvd., One Car, Two Car, Red Car, Blue Car
William Forsythe	Private Investigator/Eddie Lapowski	4, 6	The Day Fuckers, Scared Straight
Shanna Moakler	Kelsey/Blind Date	6	The Day Fuckers
John Heard	Richard Wimmer	4, 7	Snow Job, Tequila Sunrise
Melyssa Ford	Sexy Flight Attendant	4	No Cannes Do
Kim Coates	Carl Ertz	5, 8	Fantasy Island, One Last Shot
Giovanni Ribisi	Nick	5	Unlike a Virgin; Fire Sale
Kevin Pollak	Bob Levine	5	The All Out Fall Out
Fran Drescher	Mrs. Bob Levine	5	The All Out Fall Out
Jason Isaacs	Fredrick "Freddie Loventon" Line	5	Gotta Look Up to Get Down
Daniella van Graas	Natasha	5	Gotta Look Up to Get Down
Peter Stormare	Aaron Cohen	6	The Sorkin Notes, Security Briefs
Nicky Whelan	Air Hostess	6	Give a Little Bit
Jeff Garlin	Roger	7	Dramedy
Carrie Fisher	Anna Fowler	7	Tequila and Coke
Bob Odenkirk	Ken Austin	7	Porn Scenes from an Italian Restaurant
Ethan Suplee	Bartender	7	Porn Scenes from an Italian Restaurant
Tommy Gunn	Porn Vince	7	Lose Yourself
Blake Anderson	Donny	8	One Last Shot
