= Jack Mulcahy (actor) =

American actor (born 1954)

- Born: New York City, New York

Jack Mulcahy is an American actor known for being one of the leads in The Brothers McMullen.

Mulcahy started in the entertainment business as a lead vocalist and guitarist for various Rock 'n' roll bands around New York City. His first film role was in Porky's (1981), directed by Bob Clark. After the sequel, Porky's II: The Next Day (1983), Mulcahy appeared in several films and television shows including Law & Order; NYPD Blue; Creating Rem Lezar; Awakenings; and Cadillac Man. In 1995, he was cast as Jack, one of the three brothers in The Brothers McMullen. The film won the Grand Jury Prize at the Sundance Film Festival that year and was distributed by 20th Century Fox.

In 2006, he produced and starred in a play called PrimeTime, written by Alex DeWitt and directed by Fern Lopez. He later appeared in the Off-Broadway showcase of Friction. On film, Mulcahy has appeared in five lead roles, including Stuck In The Middle and Reunion 108.

In 2006, Mulcahy appeared in a Snickers commercial, playing guitar and singing.

== Filmography ==
- Porky's (1981) as Frank Bell
- Porky's II: The Next Day (1983) as Frank Bell
- Creating Rem Lezar (1989) as Rem Lezar / Policeman
- Cadillac Man (1990) as S.W.A.T. Team Officer
- Awakenings (1990) as Intern on Psych Ward (uncredited)
- The Bonfire of the Vanities (1990) as Newspaper Reporter (uncredited)
- The Fisher King (1991) as Passerby (uncredited)
- Billy Bathgate (1991) as Fire Inspector (uncredited)
- Scent of a Woman (1992) as Oak Room Patron (uncredited)
- The Brothers McMullen (1995) as Jack McMullen
- Comfortably Numb (1995) as Head Waiter
- Lowball (1996) as Bryce
- The Cottonwood (1996) as Joey Tuzzio
- A Perfect Murder (1998) as the Bartender (uncredited)
- The Reunion (1998) as Hal Coleman
- Saturday Night Live (1998, TV Series) as Supercop (uncredited)
- Sex and the City (1999, TV Series) as Wesley York (uncredited)
- Law & Order (2000, TV Series) as Lt. Reston
- Welcome to New York (2000–2001, TV Series) as the Husband (voice)
- The Blue Diner (2001) as Brian
- Infested (2002) as Bob
- Shelter Island (2003) as DJ Jack the Whack (voice)
- One Life to Live (2004–2005, TV Series) as Fisherman / Peter Bohr
- Law & Order: Special Victims Unit (2006, TV Series) as Detective Brian Beal
- Euthanasia (2006, Short) as Dad
- The Gravedancers (2006) as Police Officer #1
- El cantante (2006) as Doctor
- Midnight Son (2007, Short) as Edward Dagney (with Oscar Winner Melissa Leo)
- Life in Flight (2008) as Peter Previn (uncredited)
- Calling It Quits (2009) as Tom
- iMurders (2008) as William Jensen
- Stuck in the Middle (2011) as Leo Balmudo
- The Great Fight (2011) as Al Ryan
- The Job Interview (2011, Short) as Man
- The Onion News Network (2011, TV Series) as Commander David Hawkins
- Alleged (2012, Short) as Steven Seagal
- Twin Primes (2012, Short) as Professor Michael Clapton
- The Windermere Guest (2012, Short) as Driver
- Pale Blue Sky (2012, Short) as Mike Ross
- Reunion 108 (2013) as Teddy Mitchell
- The Jersey Devil (2014) as Lucifer
- Isolated incident (2015, Short) as Danny Brennan
- Prince Paradise (2015) as Billy the kid
- Inside You (2017) as Peter
