= Joan Boocock Lee =

British actress (1922–2017)

- Joan B. Lee with her husband Stan and daughter Joan "J. C." Lee in the 1950s
- Born: Joan Boocock; 5 February 1922 (Note: Although several sources gave her age as 93 at the time of her death, British birth records show she was, in fact, 95 years old.); Gosforth, Newcastle upon Tyne, England
- Died: 6 July 2017 (aged 95); Los Angeles, California, U.S.
- Occupations: Actress; writer
- Years active: 1981–2016
- Spouses: Sanford Weiss (m. 1943; ann. 1947); Stan Lee (m. 1947)
- Children: 2 (1 deceased)

Joan Boocock Lee (5 February 1922 – 6 July 2017) was a British actress. She was the wife of comic book creator Stan Lee, whom she met in New York City in the 1940s while working as a hat model. In her later years, Lee became a voice actress and appeared in the Spider-Man and Fantastic Four animated series in the 1990s. Kevin Smith referred to Joan as "Stan's personal superhero" and "Marvel Muse".

== Early life ==
Joan Boocock's birth was registered in the first quarter of 1922 in Castle Ward Rural District (later part of Newcastle's Metropolitan Borough) according to her birth register records. Her father, Norman Dunton Boocock married her mother Hannah Clayton in the Castle Ward district of Northumberland in 1920. In one interview, she stated that she was born in Gosforth, Newcastle, and grew up there and in Fawdon. After World War II, she relocated to the United States as a war bride after marrying an American serviceman, Sanford Dorf Weiss, whom she had only known for 24 hours prior to their marriage in 1943. Boocock was a well-known hat model prior to her marriage to Weiss. She separated from Weiss not long after.

== Marriage to Stan Lee ==
Lee's cousin had set him up on a blind date with a different model at the agency where Joan worked. When Lee went to the modelling agency to meet his intended date, Joan answered the door instead. Upon seeing her he immediately professed his love for her and told her he had been drawing her face since childhood.

Lee proposed after two weeks of dating, and she went to Reno, Nevada in order to nullify her previous marriage. On 5 December 1947, she received an annulment for her previous marriage, then married Lee in the room next door. Together, they had two daughters, Joan Celia "J. C." Lee (b. 1950), and Jan Lee, who died three days after delivery in 1953. As an interfaith couple they subsequently faced difficulty adopting. In 1949, the couple bought a two-story, three-bedroom home in Woodmere, Long Island, living there through 1952.

Lee credited Joan as being the inspiration for early incarnations of the Fantastic Four. She was also the inspiration of Gwen Stacy, Spider-Man's second girlfriend in the comics.

== Career ==
In 1981, Stan and Joan Lee moved from New York City to Los Angeles. There, she lent her voice to several animated Marvel shows in the 1990s. She first appeared in Fantastic Four in 1994, voicing a reoccurring character. She voiced a computer in the Iron Man television series for three episodes in 1994. She later appeared in Spider-Man as Madame Web, appearing in eight episodes from 1996 to 1998.

In 2002, she appeared as herself alongside Stan Lee and Kevin Smith in Stan Lee's Mutants, Monsters & Marvels. In 2003, she appeared as herself in the documentary Comic Book Superheroes Unmasked. In 2010, she appeared in a documentary about her husband called With Great Power: The Stan Lee Story. Lee made her last appearance in a cameo in the 2016 film X-Men: Apocalypse alongside her husband.

=== Writing ===
In 1987, Joan Lee wrote The Pleasure Palace, her first novel. According to her daughter, Joan had also completed three unpublished novels.

== Death ==
Lee died on 6 July 2017, in Los Angeles from stroke-related complications with her husband of almost 70 years and their daughter, Joan, at her bedside.

== Filmography ==
Year	Title	Role	Notes	Ref
1994	Iron Man	Computer Voice	Voice	
1994	Fantastic Four	Miss Forbes	Voice	
1996–98	Spider-Man: The Animated Series	Madame Web	Voice	
2002	Stan Lee's Mutants, Monsters & Marvels	Herself	Documentary	
2003	Comic Book Superheroes Unmasked	Herself	Documentary	
2010	With Great Power: The Stan Lee Story	Herself	Documentary	
2016	X-Men: Apocalypse	Joanie Lee	Live-action, cameo	
