= Scott Zakarin =

American film producer (born 1963)

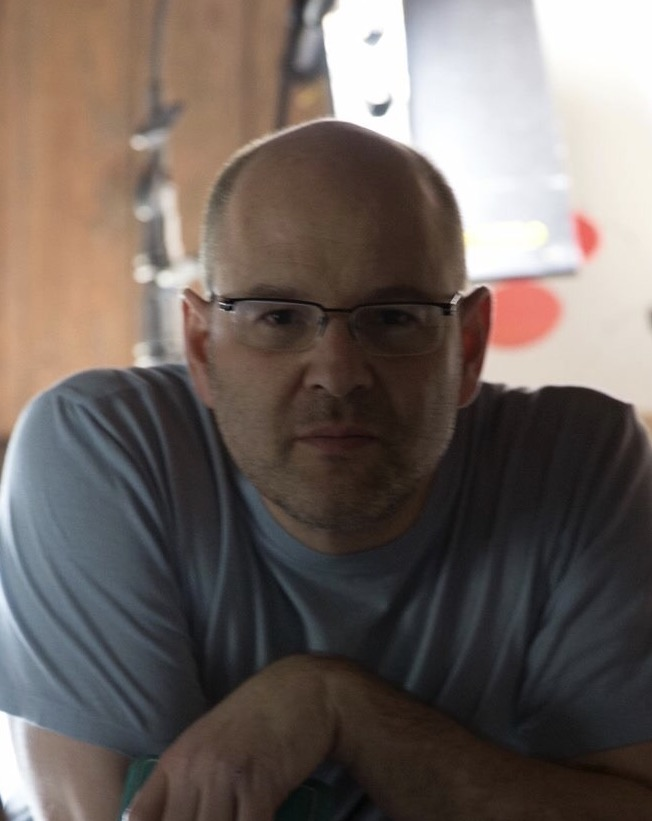
- Scott Zakarin
- Born: September 2, 1963 (age 63); Long Island, New York, U.S.
- Education: Binghamton University
- Spouse: Debra Mostow Zakarin
- Children: 2
- Parents: Irving Zakarin; Miriam Zakarin

Scott Zakarin (born September 2, 1963) is an American filmmaker, writer, producer, and multimedia creator whose work spans film, television, and web series. He is best known for creating The Spot (1995), widely recognized as the first episodic web series and a pioneering production in the development of internet entertainment. His credits include Stan Lee's Mutants, Monsters & Marvels and The Autograph King.

== Early life ==
Born in Long Island, New York, Zakarin began making full length video movies at the age of 15. He wrote and directed his first feature film: The Gifted in 1989, premiered at the Cannes Film Festival. He also made Creating Rem Lezar, a straight-to-video children's musical fantasy. Shortly after, Zakarin packed up his van and moved to Los Angeles to begin his Hollywood career at the age of 26.

== Career ==
In 1995, while directing commercials and early interactive television tests for Fattal & Collins advertising agency, Zakarin became fascinated by the Internet. He spent time in chat rooms and quickly recognized an untapped entertainment platform. In response, he joined with Troy Bolotnick, Rich Tackenberg, and Laurie Plaksin, (who also starred as the shows main character Tara Hartwick) to create The Spot, the first interactive entertainment web series that combined online diary entries, photos, video, and groundbreaking interactive techniques to create a new storytelling format known as “The Web Series”. Zakarin convinced his employer Russ Collins to back his novel idea, and the site premiered early in June 1995, running through the early summer of 1997. “The Spot” was the first winner of Infoseek's "Cool Site of the Year" (The Webby Award) for 1995.

“The Spot” was an early influencer of the Internet dot-com boom that followed. Although it attracted revenue with integrated ad campaigns for blue chip sponsors such as K-Swiss, Activision, and Toyota. Many of the expectations of those involved in the early days of online entertainment proved to be premature. Zakarin and his team left the site about a year after its launch due to creative and business differences.

Zakarin and company launched a new company, LightSpeed Media Inc., which created interactive websites for media companies such as Playboy and the first website for Activision. Next, the team created GrapeJam.com, that featured live improvisational activities and streamed radio broadcasts. GrapeJam.com was nominated for the Webby for best comedy website. People Magazine called Zakarin "King of the sit.com”.

Several high-profile media pioneers, such as Spider-Man creator Stan Lee and television programmer Brandon Tartikoff, were attracted to the new storytelling format. Tartikoff lead Zakarin to Ted Leonsis of America Online (AOL) which purchased LightSpeed Media Inc. Zakarin and Tartikoff, built, with the original creative team of "The Spot,” "Entertainment Asylum" for Aol's Leonsis, Charlie Fink, and Danny Krifcher.

After Zakarin was laid off by AOL, he turned back to more traditional media and began producing, directing, and representing movies for a company he co-founded with Rich Tackenberg called Creative Light Media. Creative Light Media operated from 1998 until 2006, distributing and producing independent films, some of which Zakarin produced, wrote, and directed. It also produced several critically well received documentaries for theatrical, video, and cable release, including: Mind Meld, featuring William Shatner and Leonard Nimoy discussing their Star Trek characters and experiences. The Miramax release, Comic Book: The Movie starring Mark Hamill, Roger Rose, Billy West and Jess Harnell, and featuring cameo appearances by Hugh Hefner, Kevin Smith, Stan Lee and dozens of other pop culture icons and innovators. “Comic Book: The Movie” won Variety's 2004 DVD Exclusive Award in the Best Live Action category. Creative Light Media also produced several re-stored collections of classic Sid Caesar comedy programs from material originally produced and broadcast for NBC-TV’s in the 50s Your Show of Shows, along with a Showtime Documentary “Hail Sid Caesar” that combined sketches and interviews with the original Show of Shows 1950s writing staff, including: Mel Brooks, Neil Simon, and Woody Allen. Scott also directed and produced Stan Lee's Mutants, Monsters & Marvels for Sony pictures, featuring Kevin Smith. In 2006, Creative Light Media created "The Fishbowl,” a website community ” “Where the Reality Stars Hang Out” and which led to the sale of the E! TV series Kill Reality, a reality TV series featuring reality all-stars as they lived together while filming a horror movie; which was executive produced by Zakarin and Tackenberg.

At the end of 2006, Zakarin returned to his new media roots with IronSink Media, creating movies and original shows for the Internet, with projects including Soup of the Day, "The VanNuys Guys" and “Shatnervision". “Shatnervision" which Zakarin produced with Paul Camuso and William Shatner, was awarded Best Original Reality Web Series at the first annual Streamy Awards in 2008.

Additionally, Zakarin is a writer and producer of “Upstairs Girls/Downstairs Guys”, an episodic web video comedy series which, as of June 2016, has collected over 600 million views on YouTube alone.

From 2013 to 2016 Zakarin was a part-time professor at Columbia College Hollywood - teaching classes in interactive media, and involved in developing the school's New media department.

In 2014 Zakarin produced two seasons of the hit web series, "The Spinoffs” for the Rush It Network, a multi-character YouTube web series that used its popularity to live tweet and video broadcast for sponsors at events like Sundance film festival and Coachella. In 2016 Zakarin started Takeover Network, a LIVE broadcast network, where fans interact with their shows.

In 2019, Zakarin created, wrote, and directed Digital Sky, a scripted science fiction anthology podcast exploring themes of social media, technology, and their influence on everyday life. The series featured performances by actors including Eric Martsolf, Britt Baron, and Julie Nathanson, with narration by Anna Brisbin. Produced by Zoit Interactive Media, Digital Sky was active from 2019 to 2021, with 26 episodes listed across its releases.

Zakarin's most recent project is The Autograph King (2026), a feature documentary he directed and produced that stars Shamim Dana and features actors RJ Mitte, Rainn Wilson, and Billy West. The film follows Dana, a young man with cerebral palsy and autism, as he travels to comic conventions across the country collecting celebrity autographs and forming friendships with the people he meets. The documentary also explores the friendship between Dana and Zakarin that develops during their travels. The film held its first theatrical premiere in September 2026, followed by a series of additional premieres across the United States.

Zakarin currently lives in Carlsbad, California with his wife, son Caleb, daughter Maci, and rescue dog named Daisy.

== Awards and honors ==
- 2008: Streamy Awards – Best Original Reality Web Series – Shatnervision – winner
- 2004: Variety, DVD Exclusive Award, Best Live Action –Comic Book: The Movie – winner
- 1999: Central character in the book Digital Babylon by John Geirland and Eva Sonesh-Kedar. Published by Arcade Publishing
- 1997: Webby Awards, Best Comedy Website – Grapejam.com – nominated
- 1995: Cool Site of the Dayear (the Webby) – The Spot – winner
