= Stan Lee's Mutants, Monsters & Marvels =

- Original DVD cover (2002)
- Directed by: Scott Zakarin
- Produced by: Eric Mittleman
- Starring: Stan Lee; Kevin Smith; Joan Boocock Lee
- Cinematography: Peter Ney
- Edited by: Mark Panik
- Production company: Creative Light Entertainment
- Distributed by: Destination Films
- Release date: May 7, 2002 (U.S.)
- Running time: 95 minutes
- Country: United States
- Language: English

Stan Lee's Mutants, Monsters & Marvels is a 2002 American documentary film produced by Creative Light Entertainment consisting of an interview of Marvel Comics publisher Stan Lee by film director Kevin Smith. The two talk about Lee's life, his marriage with Joan Lee, the 2002 Spider-Man film, and Spider-Man comics. Lee refers to Marvel Comics character J. Jonah Jameson as "the version so many people had of me." The interview was filmed in February 2002 in Santa Monica, California at a comic book store. The result was a nearly two-hour-long film. The documentary was included in a four-disc release of the 2002 Spider-Man film.
