= The Spot (web series) =

Web series (1995–1997)

- Genre: Soap opera
- Created by: Scott Zakarin
- Country of origin: United States
- Original language: English

Production
- Production companies: CyberOasis, Inc.

Original release
- Release: 1995 – 1997

The Spot, or thespot.com, was the first web series (1995–1997), and covered bandwidth and production costs by offering paid advertising banners on the web pages and product placement within the journal entries. The series earned one of the original Webby Awards.

== Overview ==
The Spot was likened to "Melrose Place-on-the-Web" and featured a rotating cast of actors playing trendy and hip twenty somethings who rented rooms in a fabled southern California beach house called “The Spot”, in Santa Monica, California. Some of the actors depicted online were also writers and behind-the-scenes production staffers on the site, while some later appeared in independent films or in broadcast television series as on-screen performers.

The characters, called "Spotmates", would keep near-daily online diaries (similar to what later came to be called blogs), respond to emails, and post images of their current activities. In addition the site boasted short episodes, as well as photos relating to the diary entries. The fanbase on the series, which called themselves "Spotfans", interacted on a daily basis with the Spotmates and each other, discussing the newsworthy events.

The series engaged the audience by allowing them to become part of the storyline and give advice to characters—sometimes succeeding in changing how characters responded to the in-story situations. Viewers were encouraged to post on the message boards (the "Spotboard"), send e-mail to the various characters offering them insight, advice and even arguments to their posted life dilemmas and dramas based on loosely orchestrated story arcs and different character viewpoints of the same storyline. The audience opinion was used by the writers to affect storyline directions, allowing the writing staff a maneuverability not possible in traditional media outlets.

== History ==
The series was started in June 1995 by Scott Zakarin, who at the time was an aspiring filmmaker from New York who had been directing television commercials for advertising agency Fattal and Collins. He convinced his employer to back the idea of an interactive fiction site, and the result was the most successful interactive fiction site to date. The site received over 100,000 hits a day, a tremendous response for its time.

In the spring of 1996, buoyed by intense media interest in the project, Zakarin sold his interest to minority investors, who sought venture capitalist backing to create an online network called American Cybercast, a spin-off from Fattal & Collins. Fattal & Collins asked their vice president, Sheri Herman to bring in venture capital as The Spot was not being monetized and draining Company resources. In a matter of weeks, Herman brought in Intel who led additional investors into an initial 7 million dollar round of financing. The new investors wanted a larger number of webisodes created under the umbrella name American Cybercast.

Zakarin was later fired by American Cybercast over creative differences concerning the original site, and the production continued under different head writers/management.

The series continued producing original content through the late spring and early summer of 1997, when American Cybercast fell into bankruptcy as the site's drawing power was diluted somewhat by a wave of imitators, some professional and some amateur. The company's resources were also drained by three parallel "online soaps" (Eon-4, The Pyramid and Quick Fix) introduced by the company to exploit the success of The Spot. Each of those additional webisodics, like the Spot before them, attracted a significant following. But none of them could generate sufficient advertising or product placement revenue to sustain them financially. The Spot closed its initial production run the night of June 30/July 1, 1997, although it remained available online with archives of the 1995–97 episodes, and kept its live message boards open, for about two years after the last original episode went live. The Spot also spawned a number of fan-related online message board communities. At least one of those sites (elgonquin.com) remains online with archived entries available for view, 15 years after The Spot itself ceased its initial original production run, although its message board was closed and taken offline early in 2009. Some of The Spot's original creative team are also active today online, including original cofounder Scott Zakarin through his Iron Sink Media family of websites and multimedia series which continue in production and air online through ironsink.com.

With no involvement from Zakarin or the original creative team, The Spot was brought back to life for a relaunch in 2004 by Stewart St. John, the original 1995–97 series' final executive producer, and Todd Fisher. It enjoyed some initial success in its relaunch and included a wireless aspect that was exclusive to Sprint, but has since gone dark once again. St. John and Fisher remain active in other film and online projects through their Stewdiomedia firm. Yet another re-launch was attempted in 2011 with the original introductory splashscreen and three episodes featuring unknown performers, stating the premise that the original Spot house was to be repurchased and re-opened as a combination residence and production center for a revived web series, to be mounted by a young cast of creative professionals. The relaunch was copyrighted by CyberOasis, Inc., the firm which purchased the intellectual property of the series site after it ceased original production. There have been no additional episodes produced of the 2011 relaunch and placed online beyond the first three, and the status of the site itself remains nearly dormant though still visible online.

== Characters ==
The characters were chiefly "played" by models, with their diaries written by Zakarin, his assistant Laurie (Shiers) Plaksin, staff writer Dennis Dortch, and staff writer/ombudsman Jeff Gouda and Melanie Hall.

The initial (1995–97) cast featured;

- Tara Hartwick – Laurie Plaksin
- Michelle – Kristin Herold
- Jeff Benton – Tim Abell
- Lon Oliver – Armando Valdes-Kennedy
- Carrie Seaver – Kristen Dolan
- Chase, Becker – Jeff Gouda
- Caldwell, Emily – Melanie Hall
- Wulf – Rich Tackenberg
- FedEx Kim – Lynn Elliot

== Sources ==
- , CNET News, January 14, 1997
- , CNET News, July 1, 1997
