= Jared Leto filmography =

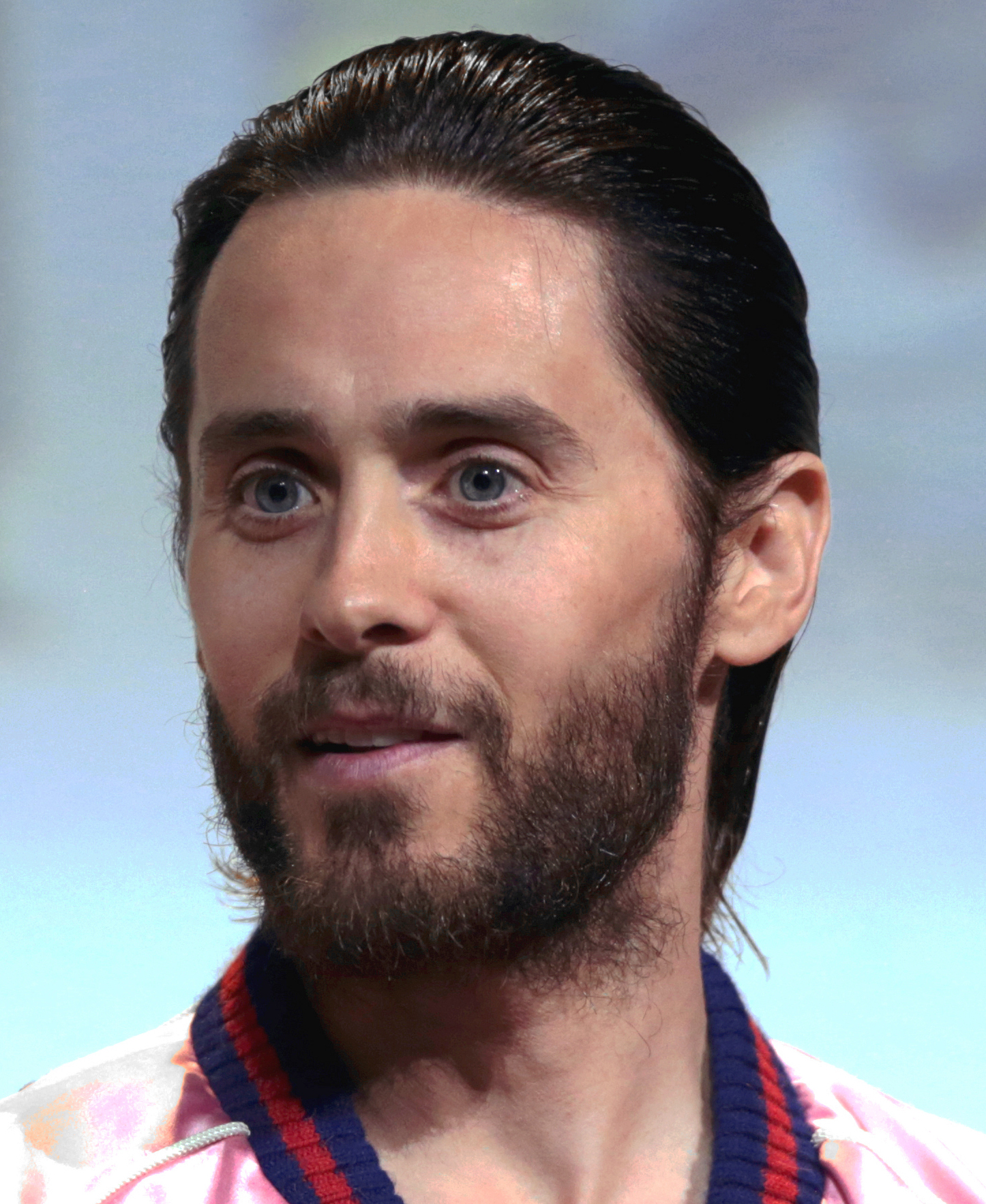
Leto at the 2016 San Diego Comic-Con

Jared Leto is an American entertainer with an extensive career in film, music, and television. He made his debut with minor roles in the television shows Camp Wilder (1992) and Almost Home (1993). He achieved recognition in 1994 for his role as Jordan Catalano in the teen drama television series My So-Called Life. The show was praised for its portrayal of adolescence and gained a cult following, despite being canceled after only one season. The same year, he made his TV movie debut starring alongside Alicia Silverstone in Cool and the Crazy. Leto's first film role was in the 1995 drama How to Make an American Quilt. He later co-starred with Christina Ricci in The Last of the High Kings (1996) and received a supporting role in Switchback (1997). In 1997, Leto starred in the biopic Prefontaine, in which he played the role of Olympic hopeful Steve Prefontaine. His portrayal received positive reviews from critics and is often considered his breakthrough role. The following year, Leto starred together with Alicia Witt in the horror Urban Legend. He then acted alongside Sean Penn and Adrien Brody in the war film The Thin Red Line (1998). After supporting roles in Black and White and Girl, Interrupted, Leto portrayed Angel Face in Fight Club (1999), which has since become a cult film.

In 2000, Leto played Paul Allen in the psychological thriller American Psycho. The same year, he starred as heroin addict Harry Goldfarb in Requiem for a Dream, directed by Darren Aronofsky. His acting in the addiction drama received praise from film critics. During this period Leto focused increasingly on his band Thirty Seconds to Mars, returning to acting in 2002 in the David Fincher-directed thriller Panic Room, which was well-received both critically and commercially. Following the lead role in the independent film Highway (2002), he co-starred with Colin Farrell in the historical drama Alexander (2004) as Hephaestion. Leto then starred together with Nicolas Cage in the political crime thriller Lord of War (2005) and acted alongside Salma Hayek in the crime drama Lonely Hearts (2006) as Raymond Fernandez. He also began to direct music videos for Thirty Seconds to Mars, with the first being "The Kill" (2006). The following year, he portrayed Mark David Chapman in the biopic Chapter 27. Despite divided critical opinion on the film as a whole, Leto's performance was widely praised.

In 2009, he starred in the science fiction drama Mr. Nobody directed by Jaco Van Dormael. Critics praised the film's artistry and Leto's acting. He later directed the music videos for "Kings and Queens" (2009) and "Hurricane" (2010), which were both nominated for the MTV Video Music Award for Best Direction. The latter garnered controversy upon release and was initially censored due to its elements of violence. In 2011 he narrated the British motorcycle racing documentary TT3D: Closer to the Edge. In 2012, Leto made his directorial debut with the documentary film Artifact. After a six-year hiatus, he returned to film acting in the 2013 drama Dallas Buyers Club starring together with Matthew McConaughey, for which he received the Academy Award for Best Supporting Actor, Golden Globe Award for Best Supporting Actor – Motion Picture, Screen Actors Guild Award for Outstanding Performance by a Male Actor in a Supporting Role and a variety of film critics' circle awards. Leto then premiered the web series Into the Wild (2014) and the documentary film A Day in the Life of America (2019). He also played the Joker in the superhero film Suicide Squad (2016), which was unfavorably reviewed by critics. Leto would reprise his role as the Joker in Zack Snyder's director cut of Justice League (2021).

In 2021, he played suspected serial killer Albert Sparma in John Lee Hancock's film The Little Things, which earned Leto nominations for a Golden Globe Award and Screen Actors Guild Award—both for Best Supporting Actor. The same year, Leto portrays fashion designer and business magnate Paolo Gucci in Ridley Scott's biographical crime drama film House of Gucci, which earned Leto nomination for a Satellite Award and Critics' Choice Movie Award—both for Best Supporting Actor. He played the Marvel Comics character Morbius the Living Vampire in the live-action film Morbius released in 2022, part of Sony's Spider-Man Universe.

== Film ==
Key
†	Indicates a film that has not yet been released
‡	Indicates a documentary

Year	Title	Credited as			Role	Notes	Refs.
Year	Title	Actor	Director	Producer	Role	Notes	Refs.
1995	How to Make an American Quilt	Yes	No	No	Beck		
1996	The Last of the High Kings	Yes	No	No	Frankie Griffin		
1997	Prefontaine	Yes	No	No	Steve Prefontaine		
1997	Switchback	Yes	No	No	Lane Dixon		
1998	Basil	Yes	No	No	Basil		
1998	Urban Legend	Yes	No	No	Paul Gardener		
1998	The Thin Red Line	Yes	No	No	2nd Lt. William Whyte		
1999	Black and White	Yes	No	No	Casey		
1999	Fight Club	Yes	No	No	Angel Face		
1999	Girl, Interrupted	Yes	No	No	Tobias Jacobs		
2000	American Psycho	Yes	No	No	Paul Allen		
2000	Requiem for a Dream	Yes	No	No	Harry Goldfarb		
2000	Sunset Strip	Yes	No	No	Glen Walker		
2001	Sol Goode	Yes	No	Co-producer	Rock Star Wannabe	Uncredited cameo	
2002	Highway	Yes	No	No	Jack Hayes		
2002	Panic Room	Yes	No	No	Junior		
2002	Phone Booth	Yes	No	No	Bobby	Deleted scene	
2004	Alexander	Yes	No	No	Hephaestion		
2005	Hubert Selby Jr: It/ll Be Better Tomorrow ‡	Yes	No	No	Himself		
2005	Lord of War	Yes	No	No	Vitaly Orlov		
2006	Lonely Hearts	Yes	No	No	Raymond Fernandez		
2007	Chapter 27	Yes	No	Executive	Mark David Chapman		
2009	Mr. Nobody	Yes	No	No	Nemo Nobody		
2011	TT3D: Closer to the Edge ‡	Yes	No	No	Narrator	Voice	
2012	Artifact ‡	Yes	Yes	Yes	Himself		
2013	Dallas Buyers Club	Yes	No	No	Rayon		
2015	Jeremy Scott: The People's Designer ‡	Yes	No	No	Himself		
2016	Holy Hell ‡	No	No	Executive	—		
2016	Suicide Squad	Yes	No	No	The Joker		
2017	2036: Nexus Dawn	Yes	No	No	Niander Wallace	Short film	
2017	Blade Runner 2049	Yes	No	No	Niander Wallace		
2018	The Outsider	Yes	No	Executive	Nick Lowell		
2019	A Day in the Life of America ‡	No	Yes	Yes	—		
2021	The Little Things	Yes	No	No	Albert Sparma		
2021	Zack Snyder's Justice League	Yes	No	No	The Joker		
2021	House of Gucci	Yes	No	No	Paolo Gucci		
2022	Morbius	Yes	No	No	Michael Morbius		
2023	Haunted Mansion	Yes	No	No	Hatbox Ghost	Voice and motion-capture	
2025	Tron: Ares	Yes	No	Yes	Ares		
2026	Masters of the Universe	Yes	No	No	Skeletor		

== Television ==
Year	Title	Credited as			Role	Notes	Refs.
Year	Title	Actor	Director	Producer	Role	Notes	Refs.
1992–1993	Camp Wilder	Yes	No	No	Dexter	2 episodes	
1993	Almost Home	Yes	No	No	Rick Aiken	1 episode	
1994–1995	My So-Called Life	Yes	No	No	Jordan Catalano	19 episodes	
1994	Cool and the Crazy	Yes	No	No	Michael	Television film	
2003	Hollywood High	Yes	No	No	Himself	Television special	
2006	The Armenian Genocide	Yes	No	No	Narrator (voice)	Television film	
2014–2015	Into the Wild	Yes	Yes	Yes	Himself	16 episodes	
2015–2018	Beyond the Horizon	Yes	Yes	Yes	Himself	17 episodes	
2016	Great Wide Open	Yes	Yes	Yes	Himself	5 episodes	
2022	WeCrashed	Yes	No	Executive	Adam Neumann	8 episodes	
2024	Wheel of Fortune	Yes	No	No	Host	1 episode	

== Music video ==
Year	Title	Credited as			Notes	Refs.
Year	Title	Director	Producer	Other	Notes	Refs.
2002	"Capricorn (A Brand New Name)"	No	No	Yes		
2003	"Edge of the Earth"	No	No	Yes		
2005	"Attack"	No	No	Yes		
2006	"The Kill"	Yes	No	No		
2006	"From Yesterday"	Yes	No	No		
2008	"A Beautiful Lie"	Yes	Executive	No		
2009	"Kings and Queens"	Yes	Yes	No		
2010	"Closer to the Edge"	Yes	Yes	Yes	Editor	
2010	"Hurricane"	Yes	No	Yes	Writer	
2011	"This Is War"	No	No	Yes		
2013	"Up in the Air"	Yes	Yes	Yes	Editor	
2013	"Do or Die"	Yes	Yes	No		
2013	"City of Angels"	Yes	Yes	Yes	Editor	
2016	"Purple Lamborghini"	No	No	Yes	Guest appearance	
2017	"Walk on Water"	Yes	Yes	No		
2018	"Rescue Me"	No	No	Yes		
2021	"Hail to the Victor"	Yes	No	Yes	Editor	
2023	"Stuck"	Yes	Executive	No		

== Video games ==
Video game credits
Year	Title	Role	Notes	Ref.
2025	Fortnite Battle Royale	Ares	Likeness	

== See also ==
- List of awards and nominations received by Jared Leto
