= 30 Seconds to Mars (album) =

Debut studio album by American rock band

Studio album by Thirty Seconds to Mars
- Released: August 27, 2002
- Recorded: 2001–2002
- Studios: Cherokee (Hollywood); Sunset Sound (Los Angeles); The Center for the Advancement of the Arts and Sciences of Sound
- Genres: Progressive rock; space rock; alternative metal
- Length: 53:07
- Labels: Immortal; Virgin
- Producers: Bob Ezrin; Brian Virtue; Thirty Seconds to Mars

Thirty Seconds to Mars chronology
30 Seconds to Mars (2002)	A Beautiful Lie (2005)

Singles from 30 Seconds to Mars
- 1. "Capricorn (A Brand New Name)" Released: July 23, 2002; 2. "Edge of the Earth" Released: March 3, 2003

30 Seconds to Mars is the debut studio album by American rock band Thirty Seconds to Mars. It was first released on August 27, 2002, by Immortal Records and distributed by Virgin Records. The album was produced by Bob Ezrin, Brian Virtue, and Thirty Seconds to Mars, and was recorded in rural Wyoming during 2001 and early 2002. It had been in the works for a couple of years, with lead vocalist Jared Leto writing the majority of the songs.

30 Seconds to Mars was described as a concept album centering on human struggle and self-determination, characterized by personal lyrics that use otherworldly elements and conceptual ideas to illustrate a truthful personal situation. The album incorporates progressive sounds with influences and elements from new wave, space rock, and electronica. Upon release, 30 Seconds to Mars received mostly positive reviews from music critics, who commended the album's lyrical content and the band's musicianship, which has been compared to the works of Pink Floyd, Tool, and Brian Eno.

The album debuted at number 107 on the Billboard 200 and number one on the US Top Heatseekers. It was a slow-burning success that eventually sold two million copies worldwide. It produced two singles, "Capricorn (A Brand New Name)" and "Edge of the Earth". Thirty Seconds to Mars promoted the album by opening concerts for bands such as Puddle of Mudd, Incubus, Sevendust, and Chevelle.

== Background and recording ==
By 1998, Thirty Seconds to Mars was performing gigs at small American venues and clubs. When they first started, lead vocalist Jared Leto did not allow his vocation as a Hollywood actor to be used in promotion of the band. They played their first concerts under different names, before finally settling on the name "Thirty Seconds to Mars", which was taken from a rare manuscript titled Argus Apocraphex. During this period, the band recorded demo tracks such as "Valhalla" and "Revolution", or "Jupiter" and "Hero", which later appeared on the debut album as "Fallen" and "Year Zero" respectively, but also "Buddha for Mary". Their work led to a number of record labels being interested in signing Thirty Seconds to Mars, which eventually signed to Immortal Records. In 1999, Virgin Records entered into the contract.

The work of Thirty Seconds to Mars generated the interest of record producer Bob Ezrin, who had previously worked on several groundbreaking projects, including The Wall by Pink Floyd, Love It to Death by Alice Cooper, and Destroyer by Kiss. Thirty Seconds to Mars contacted Ezrin because they felt that he had the ability to help them achieve their own vision and create a distinct sound; moreover, the band's members grew up listening to his work with Pink Floyd, Kiss and Alice Cooper. Brian Virtue, who had previously worked with Jane's Addiction, joined the band and Ezrin in producing the record.

Thirty Seconds to Mars retreated to the isolation of Wyoming's countryside in 2001 to record the album, tentatively titled Welcome to the Universe. The band and Ezrin chose an empty warehouse lot on 15,000 acres, starting an intense period of preproduction focused on fifty songs. The isolation allowed the band to work at a different pace. Jared Leto said that while recording in Wyoming, "there was an interesting dichotomy, a kind of contradiction with the technology and the organic world that we were surrounded [...] It's something that I think ended up in the music". Ezrin helped the band to understand the importance of an album's structure and how to create a progression, rather than a simple series of singles. "We really wanted to create something that had depth," Leto explained. He described the process of working with Ezrin as tumultuous but also fulfilling, having its own dynamics. He also stated that Virtue was a key element in helping the band define their sound. Although bassist Matt Wachter was a band member at the time, the majority of the bass tracks were recorded by Jared Leto, with Wachter only being credited as a band member.

The track "Fallen", originally titled "Jupiter", was the first to be produced for the album. Thirty Seconds to Mars initially thought to exclude the track from the record since they were not satisfied with it, but then they decided to rework the song because there were people who had strong feelings about it. The track features programming by Danny Lohner and background vocals by Maynard James Keenan. Several musicians, including Elijah Blue Allman, Renn Hawkey, as well as producers Ezrin and Virtue, contributed on selected tracks.

== Composition ==
=== Style and influences ===
"Edge of the Earth"
"Edge of the Earth", the second track on the album, mixes sounds from different genres and styles.

The style of the album combined progressive metal and space rock with influences and elements from new wave and electronica, utilizing programming and synthesizers. According to Jared Leto, the band wanted to create "something that had cohesiveness and kind of an atmospheric musical story to it". He identified groups that had a sense of identity and atmosphere as being influential on the album's songwriting. He cited classic stoner rock artists, to which he and his brother Shannon had listened while growing up. Eventually, they gravitated toward more conceptual work like Pink Floyd, David Bowie and The Cure. Thirty Seconds to Mars also drew influences from acts such as Björk, Rush, and Depeche Mode; according to Shannon Leto, the inspirations derived from "mostly big conceptional bands; bands that had depth; bands that were dynamic".

The sound of 30 Seconds to Mars takes on many musical stylistic shifts. Elizabeth Bromstein from Now magazine described it as a concoction of '80s electronics, industrial music and nu metal with a heavy dose of progressive rock. Jaan Uhelszki of Alternative Press felt that the album is made of "sterner stuff", with the band's prog-metal foundation "enhanced by an unexpectedly powerful sense of melody". Smiley Ben of BBC Collective noted in the album alternative rock tendencies. Ryan Rayhill from Blender found the album befitting prog-rock prototypes Rush and opined that Thirty Seconds to Mars "emerged with an eponymous debut that sounds like Tool on The Dark Side of the Moon", referring to the 1973 album by Pink Floyd. New Noise Magazine categorized the album as being part of a short-lived movement in rock music which the magazine called "Undercore", a synthesis of glam, goth, synth-rock, and science fiction.

=== Lyrics and themes ===
30 Seconds to Mars is a concept album focusing on human struggle and self-determination. It deals with characters who battle with social alienation, emotional isolation, and political malaise. The title itself "30 Seconds to Mars" indicates the accelerated human society and suggests a potential escapism from it. The album's lyrics describe the personal human experience through the use of metaphors and moments of fantasy. Jared Leto regarded it as a "very personal album that sometimes uses otherworldly elements and conceptual ideas to illustrate a truthful personal situation". He cited the human struggle as the most inspiring source for the band and explained that the record features "a definite desire for change, for renewal, for a new beginning and ultimately, for escape". Author Karin Lowachee commented that Leto, who wrote most of the lyrics, allows the listener to draw his or her own conclusions to the meanings of the songs. She noted that "this makes the music especially personal, as whatever images you conjure from the sound and words can be interpreted by your own inner language".

"Buddha for Mary"
"Buddha for Mary" has been called one of the most ambitious tracks on the album, featuring abstract lyrics and complex rhythm sections.

Opening track "Capricorn (A Brand New Name)" deals with a desire for renewal. Leto, however, stated that he prefers to let the listener take its own understanding and meaning from the song, claiming that the interpretation, from individual to individual, is one of the most interesting aspects of music. The track "Fallen" faces the necessity to escape from the inner world that every person has created for itself. The lyrics of "Oblivion", originally titled "The Reckoning", lead into a frantic threat, in which "Unity divides / Division will unite". Leto described this paradox as a rather common but unfortunate occurrence. A dramatic narration drives "Buddha for Mary", whose story is not about a specific person and represents a metaphor. "End of the Beginning" features a foreboding tone and emphasizes the human nature in constant search for something. The album ends with the hidden track "The Struggle", whose lyrics were taken from the ancient Chinese military treatise The Art of War, attributed to Sun Tzu.

The track "Revolution", excluded from the final track listing, was considered by some critics as having an anti-American tone. Leto rejected the claim and explained that it can be taken "many different ways" and if taken literally or politically, it could be misinterpreted. He said that the band "didn't want a song like that to overshadow what we are about" and especially after the September 11 attacks, they felt it did not fit thematically with the rest of the album, stating that "it took on new dimensions". The album features elements inspired by the science fiction novel Dune by Frank Herbert, which influenced the album's songwriting for its themes regarding the interactions of politics, religion, technology, and human emotion.

== Packaging ==
The photography for the album was handled by drummer Shannon Leto, with additional works provided by Ken Schles. The cover art features a teenage boy and some of the band's symbolism. It includes a phoenix logo, named "Mithra" by the band, that bears the motto "Provehito in Altum". Roughly translated from Latin, the phrase means "Launch forth into the deep". The band chose a phoenix for its association with rebirth and renewal in the Greek mythology. The group expressed interest in signs and symbols and their relationships with cultures and subcultures. The album's cover art was unveiled through the band's official website on July 29, 2002. However, it was not conceived to be the original concept for the artwork. The initial cover art was discontinued and destroyed during production following the September 11 attacks due to the graphic content of the image. It featured a fighter pilot ejecting from an exploding plane. Thirty Seconds to Mars explained that they never saw it as a violent image, but felt that it was inappropriate in the wake of the events.

== Release and promotion ==
30 Seconds to Mars was released on August 27, 2002, on Immortal Records in the United States and September 30 on EMI in the United Kingdom. It was originally expected to be released in early 2002. However, the band was behind schedule and the cover design needed a reshoot. The album's compact disc featured enhanced material developed by Little Lion Studios, including a promotional video titled "Capricorn" directed by Lawton Outlaw, and a behind the scenes footage edited by Ari Sandel. The Japanese edition of the album included the bonus track "Anarchy in Tokyo". "Capricorn (A Brand New Name)" was the first single taken from 30 Seconds to Mars. It was issued a month before the album's release on July 23, 2002. It had an accompanying music video directed by Paul Fedor. "Edge of the Earth" was released as the album's second single on January 28, 2003, with a music video directed by Kevin McCullough.

After five years since its original release, 30 Seconds to Mars was made available in Australia on April 7, 2007, on Virgin Records. EMI re-issued a limited edition of the album in Japan on December 2, 2009. To commemorate the 10th anniversary of the album, Thirty Seconds to Mars hosted an event called MarsX on August 27, 2012. It was broadcast worldwide through the online platform VyRT and included live playback and commentary of the record with the band, interactive discussion focused on the formation of Thirty Seconds to Mars, and exclusive acoustic performances. The album was also re-issued as a limited edition picture disc. To celebrate the 60th anniversary of the long-playing vinyl, Universal Music re-issued a double LP of 30 Seconds to Mars on September 23, 2016. A re-release on red translucent vinyl was pressed the following year in a limited edition for the 15th anniversary of the album.

=== Touring ===
The band promoted the album through a number of tours in North America. Even before its release, Puddle of Mudd invited Thirty Seconds to Mars to open a six-week tour for them in the spring of 2002. On January 30, Thirty Seconds to Mars began a promotional tour in North America. The band played its first European concert on June 24, 2002, at The Barfly in London, England. In July 2002, they began a club tour and also embarked on a North American tour supporting Incubus. In early October, they were invited by MTV to join the Campus Invasion Tour, playing ten dates in Canada alongside I Mother Earth, Billy Talent, and Pepper Sands. The band was also scheduled to open a spring tour for Adema but was forced to withdraw due to scheduling conflicts.

After playing a series of shows supporting Our Lady Peace, Thirty Seconds to Mars opened an autumn tour for Sevendust. The band's first appearance on television was on Last Call with Carson Daly on November 18, which aired on November 27, 2002. It was the last performance with guitarist Solon Bixler, which left the band due to issues primarily related to touring. The band later performed on The Tonight Show with Jay Leno and The Late Late Show with Craig Kilborn, which marked the first live performance with guitarist Tomo Miličević. In 2003, the band went on tour with Chevelle, Trust Company, and Shihad, and played thirteen shows for Lollapalooza.

== Critical reception ==
Professional ratings
Review scores
Source	Rating
Alternative Press	favorable
BBC Collective	4/5 stars
Blender	3/5 stars
E! Online	B
Exclaim!	8/10
The Gazette	4.5/5 stars
Kludge	7/10
Melodic	4/5 stars
Now	3/5
Rolling Stone	2/5 stars

30 Seconds to Mars earned mostly positive reviews upon release. At Metacritic, which assigns a normalized rating out of 100 to reviews from mainstream critics, the album received an average score of 60, based on 5 reviews. Jason Pettigrew from Alternative Press regarded it as "an ambitious, immense-sounding work that's at once rich in melody" and "lyrically jarring". Ryan Rayhill from Blender noticed "throbbing synths" and "exploding guitars", and called the album a "high-minded space opera of epic scope" narrating "tales of living in deep, black oblivion". Smiley Ben of BBC Collective described the overall sound as "certainly compelling", and praised the sonic variety, writing that the band "knowingly push[es] boundaries" producing "great music with an edge". AllMusic reviewer Jon O'Brien called the record a "highly ambitious space-themed concept album", and commended its "heavy, riff-laden" guitars, "soaring" vocals and sci-fi lyrics.

Johan Wippsson from Melodic claimed that the band has "something new to add to the world" with their space-influenced modern rock. Jeremy Gladstone of Kludge commented that the album reaches its peak with "Buddha for Mary", which he called a "virtual sonic achievement", but felt that the quality of the songs drops off at the halfway point, describing the entire project as "top-heavy". Canadian critic Karin Lowachee found the group's sound and vision reminiscent of their "concept-styled forbears" but "uniquely owned" for a contemporary audience, and wrote that the band "defies the trend by stepping out ahead of it and into the future", giving the listener something original to enjoy. Amber Authier from Exclaim! echoed this sentiment, stating that the band stretched musical borders and represented something that is "a little different", offering a "solid sound".

Mitch Joel from Blistering commended the band's musical diversity, noting that they are "worth more than most of their peers on a song-by-song magnitude." Elizabeth Bromstein of Now magazine found the track-to-track variation limited, although she appreciated the range of styles. Peter Relic of Rolling Stone gave a mixed response, stating that the album has its finer moments but felt that it is undone by Jared Leto's "baffling, pretentious poetry" and the "sanitized quality of the heavy guitars. Q magazine described it as having "a polished sheen", but opined that the "earnest, sci-fi-tinged lyrics gets monotonous" over the course of the album. In contrast, Jason D. Taylor from AllMusic commented that the "space-age themes complement the group's advanced musical achievements wonderfully". Megan O'Toole of The Gazette felt that every track on the album is a "unique masterpiece that simultaneously operates on a number of different musical and spiritual levels", writing that its music has the potential to "affect and infect the deepest recesses" of the soul.

== Commercial performance ==
In the United States, 30 Seconds to Mars entered the Billboard 200 at number 107 on the issue dated September 14, 2002. It also debuted at number one on the Top Heatseekers. After nine weeks, it fell to number 40, with sales of over 40,000 units. As of August 2006, Nielsen SoundScan estimates actual sales of the album at over 120,000 in the United States. Its lead single, "Capricorn (A Brand New Name)", entered the Mainstream Rock Tracks chart at number 40 and eventually reached a peak of number 31. In the United Kingdom, although the album never charted, it was certified silver by the British Phonographic Industry (BPI) in July 2013, denoting shipments of over 60,000 units.

In France, 30 Seconds to Mars debuted at number 142 on the national albums chart on October 5, 2002. After its release to the Australian market, the album entered the ARIA Charts at number 95 on the issue dated June 11, 2007. It peaked at number 89 the following week. In Greece, it entered the national albums chart in June 2011, in view of a band's concert held in Athens in July, reaching a peak of number 41. 30 Seconds to Mars was a slow-burning success, and eventually sold two million copies worldwide as of March 2011.

== Legacy ==
Jason D. Taylor of AllMusic considered the release of 30 Seconds to Mars a "daring new step in musical evolution" and noted that its impact left "vast corridors of sound open for the listener to meander down at will". He commented that Thirty Seconds to Mars managed to record an album that "breathes life" into the "empty shell that corporate rock has become", and felt that in "reanimating an avenue of musical expression that has for many years been on its deathbed", the band possibly offered the best rock experience of 2002. 30 Seconds to Mars was named one of the best albums of 2002 by a number of publications, including CMJ New Music Report, Kludge, Melodic, and Metal Hammer. Johan Wippsson of Melodic regarded it as "one of the most unique albums when it comes to an own style", while music critic Megan O'Toole from The Gazette felt that the band managed to "carve out a unique niche for themselves in the rock realm".

A writer of MuchMusic called the album a "work that is built to last", noting that the band produced "something unique" with "depth and substance". Artistdirect agreed and explained that 30 Seconds to Mars established the group as "fresh, new force", revealing a "multi-faceted outfit that thrived on creative exploration and escape". Jon O'Brien, writing for AllMusic, labelled the album one of the "more convincing actor-turned-rock star" efforts. In a retrospective review in 2012, Ian Winwood from Kerrang! deemed the record an "epic starting point" for the music that followed, and stated that it displayed Jared Leto's "vast, cinematic writing style". He considered its music "undoubtedly the most aggressive they've created" and regarded lead single "Capricorn (A Brand New Name)" as the band's "most muscular moment".

== Track listing ==
All tracks are written by Jared Leto, except where noted.

No.	Title	Length
1.	"Capricorn (A Brand New Name)"	3:53
2.	"Edge of the Earth"	4:37
3.	"Fallen"	4:59
4.	"Oblivion"	3:29
5.	"Buddha for Mary"	5:45
6.	"Echelon"	5:49
7.	"Welcome to the Universe"	2:40
8.	"The Mission"	4:04
9.	"End of the Beginning"	4:39
10.	"93 Million Miles"	5:20
11.	"Year Zero" (includes the hidden track "The Struggle": Jared Leto, Shannon Leto)	7:52
Total length:		53:07

30 Seconds to Mars – Japan bonus track
No.	Title	Length
11.	"Year Zero"	4:44
12.	"Anarchy in Tokyo" (includes the hidden track "The Struggle": Jared Leto, Shannon Leto)	7:35
Total length:		57:52

30 Seconds to Mars – Enhanced CD extras
No.	Title	Length
1.	"Capricorn" (Flash Video)	3:33
2.	"Behind the Scenes Footage"	5:52

== Personnel ==
Credits adapted from 30 Seconds to Mars album liner notes.

Thirty Seconds to Mars

- Jared Leto – guitar; vocals; bass guitar on tracks 1–5, 7–11; synthesizer on tracks 1–6, 8–11; programming on tracks 1–2, 4, 6, 8–9
- Shannon Leto – drums; guitar and vocals on "The Struggle"
- Solon Bixler – guitar on track 4; additional guitar on tracks 2, 9–11; bass guitar on track 6; additional synthesizer on track 10
- Matt Wachter – bass guitar (credited but does not perform)

Additional musicians

- Elijah Blue Allman – additional guitar on track 7; additional bass on track 7
- Joe Bishara – additional programming on track 4
- Bob Ezrin – piano on track 8
- Renn Hawkey – additional synthesizer on track 1
- Jeffrey Jaeger – additional guitar on track 9; additional bass on tracks 5, 9–10
- Maynard James Keenan – background vocals on track 3
- Danny Lohner – programming on track 3
- Brian Virtue – synthesizer on track 6

Production

- Bob Ezrin – production
- Brian Virtue – production; engineering
- Thirty Seconds to Mars – production; art direction, concepts and iconography
- Ben Grosse – mixing
- Tom Baker – mastering
- Shannon Leto – photography
- Ken Schles – additional photography
- Mary Fagot – creative direction
- Eric Roinestad – design
- Eric Greenspan – legal
- Arthur Spivak – management
- Dian Vaughn – business management
- Mark Walker Assante – business management

== Charts ==
Chart (2002, 2007, 2011)	Peak position
Australian Albums (ARIA)	89
French Albums (SNEP)	142
Greek Albums (IFPI Greece)	41
US Billboard 200	107
US Top Heatseekers (Billboard)	1

== Certifications ==
Region	Certification	Certified units/sales
United Kingdom (BPI)	Silver	60,000^{*}
^{*} Sales figures based on certification alone.

== Release history ==
Region	Date	Format	Label
United States	August 27, 2002	CD, digital download	Immortal; Virgin
Canada	September 24, 2002	CD, digital download	EMI
Japan	September 26, 2002	CD, digital download	EMI
Netherlands	September 26, 2002	CD, digital download	Virgin
Germany	September 27, 2002	CD, digital download	EMI
Italy	September 27, 2002	CD, digital download	EMI
United Kingdom	September 30, 2002	CD, digital download	EMI
Australia	April 7, 2007	CD, digital download	Virgin; EMI
New Zealand	August 7, 2007	CD, digital download	Virgin; EMI
Japan	December 2, 2009	CD (limited edition)	EMI
United States	August 27, 2012	LP (limited edition)	Virgin
