= List of awards and nominations received by Jared Leto =

Jared Leto awards and nominations
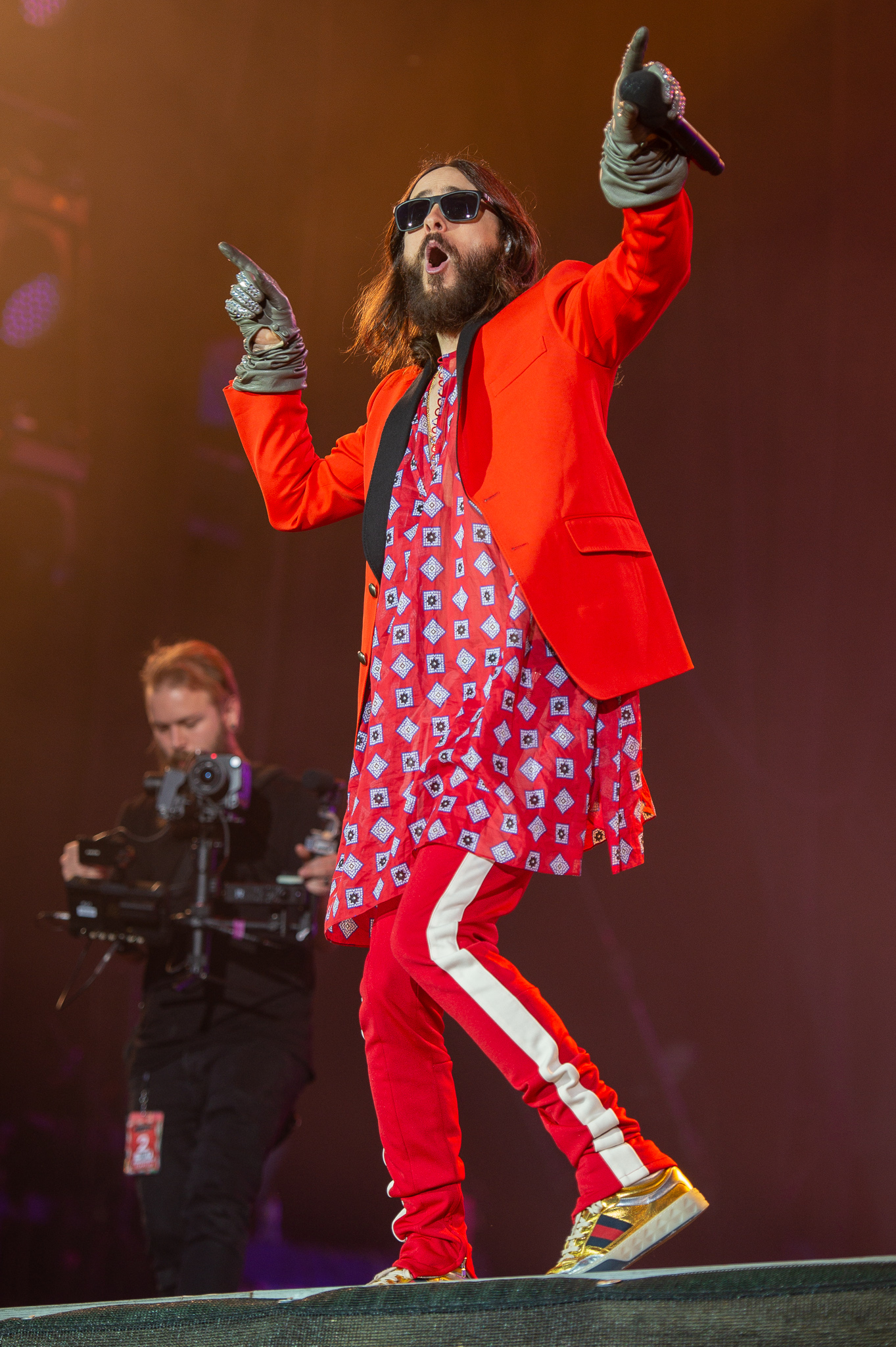
- Leto performing at Rock im Park, 2018
Accolades
Award	Won	Nominated
Academy Awards	1	1
Critics' Choice Movie Awards	1	2
Golden Globe Awards	1	2
Independent Spirit Awards	1	1
Kerrang! Awards	0	1
MTV Movie Awards	1	3
MTV Video Music Awards	0	4
Satellite Awards	2	4
Screen Actors Guild Awards	1	5
- Total number of awards and nominations
Totals	44	102
- References

This is a list of awards and nominations received by Jared Leto. As of January 2026, Jared Leto has been nominated for 102 awards, winning 44. His awards in music are credited to him and fellow rock band members of Thirty Seconds to Mars.

For his performance in Mr. Nobody (2009), Leto was listed as the runner-up for the Volpi Cup for Best Actor at the Venice Film Festival. He played trans woman Rayon in Jean-Marc Vallée's film Dallas Buyers Club, his first film role in five years. The film was released in November 2013, receiving acclaim from reviewers and roused nominations for major awards. Leto won the Critics' Choice Movie Award, Golden Globe Award, Screen Actors Guild Award, and Academy Award—all for Best Supporting Actor.

Leto played serial killer Albert Sparma in John Lee Hancock's film The Little Things (2021), which earned him nominations for a Golden Globe Award and Screen Actors Guild Award—both for Best Supporting Actor. The same year, Leto portrays fashion designer and business magnate Paolo Gucci in Ridley Scott's biographical crime drama film House of Gucci, for which he was nominated for a Satellite Award, Critics' Choice Movie Award and Screen Actors Guild Award.

== Awards and nominations ==
Organization	Year	Category	Work	Result	Ref.
AACTA Awards	2013	Best Supporting Actor	Dallas Buyers Club	Nominated	
AARP Movies for Grownups Awards	2022	Best Supporting Actor	House of Gucci	Won	
AARP Movies for Grownups Awards	2022	Best Ensemble	House of Gucci	Nominated	
Academy Awards	2014	Best Supporting Actor	Dallas Buyers Club	Won	
African-American Film Critics Association	2013	Best Supporting Actor	Dallas Buyers Club	Won	
Alliance of Women Film Journalists	2013	Best Supporting Actor	Dallas Buyers Club	Won	
Austin Film Critics Association	2013	Best Supporting Actor	Dallas Buyers Club	Won	
Boston Society of Film Critics	2013	Best Supporting Actor	Dallas Buyers Club	Runner-up	
Bravo Otto Awards	1996	Outstanding Performance by a Male Actor in a Television Series	My So-Called Life	Nominated	
Bravo Otto Awards	1997	Outstanding Performance by a Male Actor in a Television Series	My So-Called Life	Nominated	
Breakthrough of the Year Awards	2006	Crossover Artist	—	Won	
Bucheon Film Critics Association	2010	Best Actor	Mr. Nobody	Won	
Camerimage	2013	Best Music Video	"Up in the Air"	Nominated	
Chicago Film Critics Association	2013	Best Supporting Actor	Dallas Buyers Club	Won	
Chlotrudis Awards	2001	Best Ensemble	Requiem for a Dream	Nominated	
Chlotrudis Awards	2014	Best Supporting Actor	Dallas Buyers Club	Won	
Critics' Choice Movie Awards	2014	Best Supporting Actor	Dallas Buyers Club	Won	
Critics' Choice Movie Awards	2022	Best Supporting Actor	House of Gucci	Nominated	
Critics' Choice Super Awards	2026	Best Villain in a Movie	Masters of the Universe	Nominated	
Dallas–Fort Worth Film Critics Association	2013	Best Supporting Actor	Dallas Buyers Club	Won	
Detroit Film Critics Society	2013	Best Supporting Actor	Dallas Buyers Club	Won	
Detroit Film Critics Society	2021	Best Supporting Actor	House of Gucci	Nominated	
Detroit Film Critics Society	2021	Best Ensemble	House of Gucci	Nominated	
Días de Cine	2015	Best Actor – International	Dallas Buyers Club	Runner-up	
Dorian Awards	2014	Film Performance of the Year – Actor	Dallas Buyers Club	Nominated	
Fangoria Chainsaw Awards	2006	Prince of Darkness	—	Won	
Florida Film Critics Circle	2013	Best Supporting Actor	Dallas Buyers Club	Won	
Florida Film Critics Circle	2021	Best Supporting Actor	House of Gucci	Nominated	
Georgia Film Critics Association	2014	Best Supporting Actor	Dallas Buyers Club	Nominated	
Golden Globe Awards	2014	Best Supporting Actor – Motion Picture	Dallas Buyers Club	Won	
Golden Globe Awards	2021	Best Supporting Actor – Motion Picture	The Little Things	Nominated	
Golden Raspberry Awards	2017	Worst Supporting Actor	Suicide Squad	Nominated	
Golden Raspberry Awards	2022	Worst Supporting Actor	House of Gucci	Won	
Golden Raspberry Awards	2022	Worst Screen Combo (shared with either his 17-pound latex face, his geeky clothes or his ridiculous accent)	House of Gucci	Nominated	
Golden Raspberry Awards	2023	Worst Actor	Morbius	Won	
Golden Raspberry Awards	2026	Worst Actor	Tron: Ares	Nominated	
Golden Schmoes Awards	2013	Supporting Actor of the Year	Dallas Buyers Club	Won	
Golden Schmoes Awards	2022	Supporting Actor of the Year	House of Gucci	Nominated	
Gotham Awards	2012	Audience Award	Artifact	Won	
Guardian Film Awards	2014	Best Supporting Actor	Dallas Buyers Club	Nominated	
Hollywood Film Awards	2013	Breakout Performance	Dallas Buyers Club	Won	
Houston Film Critics Society	2013	Best Supporting Actor	Dallas Buyers Club	Won	
IGN Awards	2013	Best Actor	Dallas Buyers Club	Nominated	
Independent Lens	2021	Audience Award	A Day in the Life of America	Nominated	
Independent Spirit Awards	2014	Best Supporting Male	Dallas Buyers Club	Won	
IndieWire Critics Poll	2013	Best Supporting Actor	Dallas Buyers Club	Runner-up	
International Cinephile Society	2014	Best Supporting Actor	Dallas Buyers Club	Nominated	
Jupiter Awards	2017	Best Actor – International	Suicide Squad	Nominated	
Kerrang! Awards	2012	Hero of the Year	—	Nominated	
London Film Critics' Circle	2013	Supporting Actor of the Year	Dallas Buyers Club	Nominated	
Los Angeles Film Critics Association	2013	Best Supporting Actor	Dallas Buyers Club	Won	
Mill Valley Film Festival	2013	Spotlight Award	Dallas Buyers Club	Won	
MTV Italian Music Awards	2011	Best Look	—	Nominated	
MTV Movie & TV Awards	2014	Best On-Screen Duo	Dallas Buyers Club	Nominated	
MTV Movie & TV Awards	2014	Best On-Screen Transformation	Dallas Buyers Club	Won	
MTV Movie & TV Awards	2017	Best Villain	Suicide Squad	Nominated	
MTV Video Music Awards	2010	Best Direction	"Kings and Queens"	Nominated	
MTV Video Music Awards	2011	Best Direction	"Hurricane"	Nominated	
MTV Video Music Awards	2011	Best Cinematography	"Hurricane"	Nominated	
MTV Video Music Awards	2011	Best Editing	"Hurricane"	Nominated	
National Film Critics Circle	2008	Best Actor	Chapter 27	Nominated	
National Society of Film Critics	2013	Best Supporting Actor	Dallas Buyers Club	Runner-up	
New York Film Critics Circle	2000	Best Actor	Requiem for a Dream	Nominated	
New York Film Critics Circle	2013	Best Supporting Actor	Dallas Buyers Club	Won	
New York Film Critics Online	2013	Best Supporting Actor	Dallas Buyers Club	Won	
NME Awards	2011	Hottest Male	—	Nominated	
NME Awards	2012	Hottest Male	—	Won	
NME Awards	2012	Best Book	Notes from the Outernet	Nominated	
Online Film Critics Society	2000	Best Ensemble	Requiem for a Dream	Nominated	
Online Film Critics Society	2013	Best Supporting Actor	Dallas Buyers Club	Nominated	
Rock on Request Awards	2007	Best Male Rock Vocal Performance	"From Yesterday"	Won	
Rock on Request Awards	2007	Frontman of the Year	—	Won	
Rock on Request Awards	2008	Frontman of the Year	—	Won	
Rock on Request Awards	2009	Frontman of the Year	—	Won	
Russian National Movie Awards	2011	Best Actor – International	Mr. Nobody	Nominated	
Russian National Movie Awards	2014	Actor of the Decade – International	—	Nominated	
San Diego Film Critics Society	2013	Best Supporting Actor	Dallas Buyers Club	Won	
San Francisco Film Critics Circle	2013	Best Supporting Actor	Dallas Buyers Club	Nominated	
Santa Barbara International Film Festival	2014	Virtuosos Award	Dallas Buyers Club	Won	
Satellite Awards	1998	Outstanding Motion Picture Ensemble	The Thin Red Line	Won	
Satellite Awards	2014	Best Supporting Actor – Motion Picture	Dallas Buyers Club	Won	
Satellite Awards	2022	Best Supporting Actor – Motion Picture	House of Gucci	Nominated	
Satellite Awards	2023	Best Actor in a Miniseries, Limited Series, or Motion Picture Made for Television	WeCrashed	Nominated	
Screen Actors Guild Awards	2014	Outstanding Performance by a Cast in a Motion Picture	Dallas Buyers Club	Nominated	
Screen Actors Guild Awards	2014	Outstanding Performance by a Male Actor in a Supporting Role	Dallas Buyers Club	Won	
Screen Actors Guild Awards	2021	Outstanding Performance by a Male Actor in a Supporting Role	The Little Things	Nominated	
Screen Actors Guild Awards	2022	Outstanding Performance by a Male Actor in a Supporting Role	House of Gucci	Nominated	
Screen Actors Guild Awards	2022	Outstanding Performance by a Cast in a Motion Picture	House of Gucci	Nominated	
Shorty Awards	2016	Best Actor in Social Media	—	Nominated	
St. Louis Gateway Film Critics Association	2013	Best Supporting Actor	Dallas Buyers Club	Won	
St. Louis Gateway Film Critics Association	2021	Best Supporting Actor	House of Gucci	Nominated	
SXSW Film Festival	2013	Audience Award	Artifact	Nominated	
Toronto Film Critics Association	2013	Best Supporting Actor	Dallas Buyers Club	Won	
Toronto International Film Festival	2012	People's Choice Award: Documentaries	Artifact	Won	
Vancouver Film Critics Circle	2013	Best Supporting Actor	Dallas Buyers Club	Won	
Venice Film Festival	2009	Best Actor	Mr. Nobody	Runner-up	
Village Voice Film Poll	2013	Best Supporting Actor	Dallas Buyers Club	Nominated	
Virgin Media Music Awards	2007	Most Fanciable Male	—	Nominated	
Washington D.C. Area Film Critics Association	2013	Best Supporting Actor	Dallas Buyers Club	Won	
Zurich Film Festival	2007	Best Actor	Chapter 27	Won	

== See also ==
- List of awards and nominations received by Thirty Seconds to Mars
