= Edge of the Earth (Thirty Seconds to Mars song) =

- "Edge of the Earth" US promotional single

Single by Thirty Seconds to Mars

from the album 30 Seconds to Mars
- Released: March 3, 2003
- Recorded: 2001–2002
- Studio: Cherokee Studios, Los Angeles, California; Sunset Sound, Los Angeles, California; The Center for the Advancement of the Arts and Sciences of Sound
- Genre: Space rock; alternative metal
- Length: 4:36
- Label: Immortal; Virgin
- Songwriter: Jared Leto
- Producers: Bob Ezrin; Brian Virtue; Thirty Seconds to Mars

Thirty Seconds to Mars singles chronology
| "Capricorn (A Brand New Name)" (2002) | "Edge of the Earth" (2003) | "Attack" (2005) |

Music video
- "Edge of the Earth" on YouTube

"Edge of the Earth" is a song by American rock band Thirty Seconds to Mars. The song was released through Immortal and Virgin on March 3, 2003, as the second single from the band's self-titled debut album. The song was written by Jared Leto and was produced by Bob Ezrin, Brian Virtue and 30 Seconds to Mars.

== Release ==
30 Seconds to Mars released "Edge of the Earth" to American radio on January 28, 2003. The song was first performed on television on January 17, 2003, during The Tonight Show with Jay Leno. "Edge of the Earth" was also performed on The Late Late Show with Craig Kilborn on February 3, 2003. It was the first performance of 30 Seconds to Mars with the guitarist Tomo Miličević, who replaced Solon Bixler few days earlier. The music video for the song was directed by Kevin McCullough and premiered on March 27, 2003, on the band's official website. The video contains concert footage, meetings with fans and behind the scenes of shows.

"Edge of the Earth" was featured in the trailer for Need for Speed: Hot Pursuit which played at Electronic Entertainment Expo 2010. The song has also been included on the soundtrack of the game. The Vitamin String Quartet recorded a cover version of "Edge of the Earth", which was released on the tribute album Vitamin String Quartet Tribute to 30 Seconds to Mars (2008). The group used violins, viola, cello and double bass to express their interpretation of the music of 30 Seconds to Mars.

== Track listing ==
US promotional single

1. "Edge of the Earth" (Radio Edit) – 3:58
2. "Edge of the Earth" (Album Version) – 4:36

== Personnel ==
Credits adapted from 30 Seconds to Mars booklet.

- Performed by 30 Seconds to Mars
  - Jared Leto — vocals, guitar, bass, synthesizer, programming
  - Shannon Leto — drums
  - Solon Bixler — rhythm guitar
- Written by Jared Leto
- Published by Apocraphex Music (ASCAP)
- Produced by Bob Ezrin with Brian Virtue and 30 Seconds to Mars
- Recorded at Cherokee Studios, Sunset Sound, Los Angeles and The Center for the Advancement of the Arts and Sciences of Sound
- Engineered by Brian Virtue
- Mastered by Tom Baker, Precision Mastering, Hollywood, CA

== Release history ==
| Region | Date | Format | Label |
|---|---|---|---|
| United States | January 28, 2003 | Modern rock radio | Immortal; Virgin |
| United States | March 3, 2003 | Digital download | Immortal; Virgin |
