= Capricorn (A Brand New Name) =

Single by Thirty Seconds to Mars

from the album 30 Seconds to Mars
- Released: July 23, 2002
- Recorded: 2001–2002; Cherokee Studios, Sunset Sound (Los Angeles, California); The Center for the Advancement of the Arts and Sciences of Sound
- Length: 3:53
- Label: Immortal; Virgin
- Songwriter: Jared Leto
- Producers: Bob Ezrin; Brian Virtue; Thirty Seconds to Mars

Thirty Seconds to Mars singles chronology
| "Capricorn (A Brand New Name)" (2002) | "Edge of the Earth" (2003) |

Music video
- "Capricon (A Brand New Name)" on YouTube

"Capricorn (A Brand New Name)" is the debut song by American rock band Thirty Seconds to Mars. The song was released by Immortal Records on July 23, 2002, as the lead single from the band's self-titled debut album. The song was written by Jared Leto and was produced by Bob Ezrin, Brian Virtue and 30 Seconds to Mars. According to Jared Leto, the song is about a desire for renewal. "Capricorn (A Brand New Name)" first appearance was on the compilation Rock Tune Up #249 released by The Album Network on April 5, 2002.

"Capricorn (A Brand New Name)" has been critically appreciated, with reviewers complimenting its fusion of different genres. The song reached number 31 on the Billboard's Mainstream Rock Tracks and topped the Heatseekers Songs chart. The accompanying music video takes place in the California desert where band is playing in a ditch. It aired on August 6, 2002, and received airplay at MTV, MTV2, Brand New and MuchMusic USA.

On November 18, 2002, 30 Seconds to Mars performed "Capricorn (A Brand New Name)" for the first time on television on Last Call with Carson Daly, which aired on November 27, 2002.

== Background ==
During an interview of The Album Network, Jared Leto explained that the song is "less about reinventing yourself and more about finding out who you really are, your true self. That's a pretty important thing. That feeling of if you could just go back, knowing what you know now." Leto said: "In a general sense, it is about a desire for renewal. But I'd rather let people take their own understanding and meaning from the song. I think that is one of the exciting things about music, the interpretation, from individual to individual and how it can change so much."

== Release ==
30 Seconds to Mars released "Capricorn (A Brand New Name)" in April 2002 as the album's lead single. The single released in the United Kingdom was pressed with the B-side "Phase 1: Fortification". In early 2002, the song was released on the promo Songs From 30 Seconds to Mars, which also included "End of the Beginning". The song was released on the compilation Rock Tune Up #249, the cover of which has 30 Seconds to Mars as the featured artist.

The song entered the Billboard Mainstream Rock Tracks at number 40 on September 7, and reached the peak position of 31 on October 5, 2002, remaining eight weeks on the chart. The song also reached number one on the Heatseekers Songs chart. The song peaked at number 12 on the WNYU-FM chart of April 19, 2002.

== Critical reception ==
"Capricorn (A Brand New Name)" has been given mostly positive reviews from critics. Amber Authier from Exclaim! praised the song, saying "30 Seconds to Mars approaches songs like 'Capricorn (A Brand New Name)' and 'Welcome to the Universe' in a unique way, considering their time." Kenny Hammond of 411mania praised the song, writing that "Capricorn (A Brand New Name)" "is a dynamically high energy rock song. This song does not only explore the musical boundaries of 30 Seconds to Mars, but also the vocal range of Leto. 'Capricorn' overall is the strongest track on the CD, the riffs are catchy and the song's post production is above stellar. 'Capricorn' should not only impress rock fans, but also fans of many different musical styles." Smiley Ben of BBC commented that "with titles such as 'Capricorn (A Brand New Name)', 'Echelon', and 'Welcome to the Universe', they knowingly push boundaries and produce great music with an edge." Megan O'Toole of The Gazette praised the song, stating that "'Capricorn' launches an arrow of alienation toward the hearts of today's youth; yet, instead of being bleak, the track is poignantly resonant." Jay Gordon praised the song and described it as "an interesting fusion of nu metal, techno, new wave, synthetics, and hints of popish undertone." He also listed the song as one of the top tracks from the album. Johan Wippsson of Melodic.net wrote a similar review, saying that "'Capricorn' is a marvelous tune where their mix of styles just presses out energy and edge."

== Music video ==
The music video was directed by Paul Fedor and it premiered on August 6, 2002, on MuchMusic USA's show Oven Fresh, which highlights new videos. The video was shot in the California desert. Jared Leto had an idea about kids hearing something from the ground, about mud. Fedor explained that was difficult shot the video, and commented "this video was my hey day.... my apex.... the day I went Erich von Stroheim." The music video features the band members in a desert-mud based set where people are digging in mud pits. The band are playing in a ditch where others are watching them. Near the end of the video, what appears to be a SWAT team arrives and begins taking control of the area, hosing down the diggers. The band's logos are shown different times on a stone-based plate.

Throughout the video Jared Leto's face is rarely shown, because during the production of the video, Leto was accidentally hit by guitarist Solon Bixler in the forehead, causing a huge lump with severe swelling. This can be seen if the video is carefully viewed.

== Track listing ==
US promo CD single

1. "Capricorn (A Brand New Name)" (Radio Edit) – 3:37
2. "Capricorn (A Brand New Name)" (Album Version) – 3:52
3. "Call Out Hook" – 0:23

UK promo CD single

1. "Capricorn (A Brand New Name)" (Radio Edit) – 3:37
2. "Capricorn (A Brand New Name)" (Album Version) – 3:52

UK CD single

1. "Capricorn (A Brand New Name)" (Radio Edit) – 3:37
2. "Capricorn (A Brand New Name)" (Album Version) – 3:53
3. "Phase 1: Fortification" – 4:58
4. "Capricorn (A Brand New Name)" (Music Video) – 4:05

== Credits and personnel ==
Credits adapted from 30 Seconds to Mars album liner notes.

- Performed by Thirty Seconds to Mars
  - Jared Leto – vocals, guitar, bass, synthesizer, programming
  - Shannon Leto – drums
- Written by Jared Leto
- Produced by Bob Ezrin with Brian Virtue and Thirty Seconds to Mars
- Additional synthesizer by Renn Hawkey
- Audio engineering by Brian Virtue
- Mixed by Ben Grosse at The Mix Room, Burbank, California
- Mastered by Tom Baker at Precision Mastering, Hollywood, California

== Charts ==
| Chart (2002) | Peak position |
|---|---|
| US Mainstream Rock (Billboard) | 31 |
