= Into the Wild (TV series) =

- Genre: Documentary
- Written by: Jared Leto
- Directed by: Bartholomew Cubbins
- Starring: Jared Leto; Shannon Leto; Tomo Miličević
- Country of origin: United States
- Original language: English
- No. of seasons: 1
- No. of episodes: 17

Production
- Producers: Jared Leto; Emma Ludbrook
- Production company: Sisyphus Corporation

Original release
- Network: VyRT
- Release: November 30, 2014 – April 19, 2015

Into the Wild is an American documentary series written and directed by Jared Leto. The series tells the story behind the concert tour of the same name by American rock band Thirty Seconds to Mars, which propelled the group into arenas around the world and was certified by the Guinness World Records as the longest running tour in the history of rock music. The series is produced by Leto and Emma Ludbrook through the production company Sisyphus Corporation. Into the Wild premiered internationally on November 30, 2014, on the online platform VyRT.

== Background ==
Thirty Seconds to Mars released their third studio album This Is War on December 8, 2009. After a promotional tour in winter of that year, the band embarked on their Into the Wild Tour in February 2010 in support of the album. The tour reached the Americas, Europe, Africa, Asia and Australasia over a two-year period. Along with playing arenas and amphitheatres, the tour headlined at several festivals in Europe and Australia. On October 16, 2011, it was announced that the band would enter the Guinness World Records for most live shows during a single album cycle, with 300 shows. The 300th show, called Tribus Centum Numerarae, took place on December 7, 2011 at the Hammerstein Ballroom in New York City and was followed by a special series of shows which marked the end of the Into the Wild Tour.

A concert film recorded during the tour was first announced through several teasers released in 2012. Jared Leto, however, after noticing the amount of live footage recorded, decided to release a documentary series which was officially announced on November 3, 2014. In an interview with Rolling Stone, Leto stated, "You travel the world, you get on stages all over the planet, you have all kinds of once-in-a-lifetime experiences, and what's special is to document that and then share it. This is us in Lebanon and Russia and Israel and Brazil and South Africa – we're sharing some of the most intimate moments of our lives, and also some of the biggest."

== Overview ==
The series is set to have "anywhere from 16 to 20-something" episodes where Thirty Seconds to Mars travel the world in support of their third album This Is War.

Leto described the series as an "unofficial sequel" to Artifact, a documentary film about the legal dispute between Thirty Seconds to Mars and record label EMI. He explained, "it's what happens when Artifact left off. Literally. The last shot of the film is the first shot of the series." The series is directed by Jared Leto under his longtime pseudonym Bartholomew Cubbins. A trailer for the series premiered in November 2014, featuring a British narrator and assorted live scenes, paired with some interviews and some of the band's songs, including "Closer to the Edge".

== Episodes ==
No.	Title	Original release date
1	"The Adventure of a Lifetime"	November 30, 2014
2	"A Beautiful Disaster"	December 7, 2014
3	"From Basements to Arenas"	December 14, 2014
4	"Birth of a Movement"	January 11, 2015
5	"Two Brothers"	January 18, 2015
6	"The Edge of the Earth"	January 25, 2015
7	"The Adventures of Bartholomew Cubbins"	February 1, 2015
8	"A Familiar Place"	February 8, 2015
9	"Behind the Curtain"	February 15, 2015
10	"Brave New World"	February 22, 2015
11	"The Battles of Our Youth"	March 1, 2015
12	"In Defense of Our Dreams"	March 8, 2015
13	"Into Oblivion"	March 15, 2015
14	"A Million Little Pieces"	March 29, 2015
15	"The Mars Confessions"	April 5, 2015
16	"The War Is Won"	April 12, 2015
17	"A New Beginning"	April 19, 2015
