= Ken Schles =

American photographer

Ken Schles (born 1960) is an American photographer based in Fort Greene, Brooklyn, New York. He has published five monographs over 25 years. Schles' work is held in the collections of the Museum of Modern Art, the Metropolitan Museum of Art, The Brooklyn Museum, Art Institute of Chicago, Museo D'Arte Contemporanea, Los Angeles County Museum of Art, and others.

== Career ==
Schles earned his BFA from Cooper Union in 1982. After continuing his studies at the New School for Social Research, he worked as a printer for a number of Magnum Photos photographers. Schles is a New York Foundation for the Arts fellow.

Schles began producing Invisible City (1988) in 1983, when he lived in a run-down apartment in the East Village neighborhood of New York City. City officials made the landlord turn off the boiler in the building because it was leaking carbon monoxide, the building had become a "shooting gallery" for heroin addicts. The neighborhood was in shambles and junkies were a constant threat. So, Schles' landlord boarded the windows to prevent break-ins, this worked to Schles' advantage, the boarded-up space provided Schles the perfect environment to create a dark room. From his created darkroom he developed the photos of his surroundings and the general life of 1980s New York City. In 2014, both The New York Times and Time named Invisible City among the notable photobooks of that year.

In The Geometry of Innocence (2001) Schles' focus is on the shifting of social structures and spaces that mark the urban landscape. The works in The Geometry of Innocence address the immediacy and relativity of meaning in the photographic image and how they shape societies' perception of the world around them. Schles's images include images from, Death Row, hospital rooms, playgrounds, militarized zones, city streets, and bars and clubs.

Schles uses his book A New History Of Photography: The World Outside And The Pictures In Our Heads (2008) to examine the influence and our relationship to the history of photography and of photo book making itself.

Schles' monograph Oculus (2011) is an investigative textual photo book about the relationship between images, light, and their natural relationship to the mind's interpretation.

Night Walk (2014) is a companion volume to Invisible City, with images from the same period. In it Schles explores different versions of focus to tell a photographic-narrative of 1980's life on the Lower East Side of Manhattan.

== Publications ==
- Invisible City. Twelvetrees, 1988.
- The Geometry of Innocence. Hatje Cantz, 2001.
- A New History Of Photography: The World Outside And The Pictures In Our Heads. White, 2008.
- Oculus. Noorderlicht, 2011.
- Night Walk. Steidl, 2014.

== Collections ==
Schles' work is held in the following permanent public collections:

- Museum of Modern Art, New York.
- Metropolitan Museum of Art, New York.
- Library at the Getty Research Institute, Los Angeles, CA.
- Wallach Division of Art, Prints and Photographs at The New York Public Library, New York.
- Los Angeles County Museum of Art, Los Angeles, CA.
- Museum of Fine Arts, Houston, TX.
- The Brooklyn Museum, New York.
- Art Institute of Chicago, Chicago, IL.
- Corcoran Museum of Art, Washington, D.C.
- The Cleveland Museum Of Art, OH.
- Permanent Collection of the US Embassy, Sana'a, Yemen.
- San Francisco Museum of Modern Art Architecture and Design Permanent Collection, CA.
- The Manfred Heiting Collection, Los Angeles, CA.
