= The Last of the High Kings =

1996 Irish film directed by David Keating

- Directed by: David Keating
- Screenplay by: Gabriel Byrne; David Keating
- Based on: The Last of the High Kings by Ferdia Mac Anna
- Produced by: Gabriel Byrne; Paul Feldsher; Keith Northrop; Tim Palmer
- Starring: Catherine O'Hara; Jared Leto; Christina Ricci; Gabriel Byrne; Amanda Shun; Stephen Rea; Colm Meaney
- Cinematography: Bernd Heinl
- Edited by: Ray Lovejoy
- Music by: Michael Convertino
- Production companies: Nordisk Film; Northolme Entertainment; Parallel Film Productions; Raidió Teilifís Éireann
- Distributed by: First Independent Films
- Release dates: 11 July 1996 (Galway Film Fleadh); 22 November 1996 (Ireland)
- Running time: 104 minutes
- Country: Ireland
- Language: English
- Budget: $3.6 million

The Last of the High Kings, released under the title Summer Fling in some countries, is a 1996 Irish coming-of-age comedy-drama film directed by David Keating from a screenplay he co-wrote with Gabriel Byrne, based on the novel of the same name by Ferdia Mac Anna. It is set in 1970s Howth, Dublin, following teenaged friends becoming immersed in the emerging punk scene, against the backdrop of the death of Elvis Presley, and various teen drama. The film stars Catherine O'Hara, Jared Leto (in his first starring role), Christina Ricci, Byrne, Amanda Shun, Stephen Rea, and Colm Meaney.

The Last of the High Kings premiered at the Galway Film Fleadh on 11 July 1996, and was released in Ireland by First Independent Films on 22 November 1996.

== Plot ==
In the summer of 1977, in the coastal village of Howth, County Dublin, Ireland, on his last day of secondary school, a despondent Frankie believes he has failed his final exams. His plans to attend university and romance girls such as his classmates Romy and Jayne have been ruined. Nevertheless, he cheerfully goes out with friends that night.

The morning of June 30, Frankie anxiously begins waiting out the seven weeks until August 18, when his exam results are expected. Frankie's mother, Cathleen, berates him in front of his younger brother, Ray. When Frankie's theatrical father, Jack arrives, he impatiently drives his car through the locked property gate, damaging it before greeting his wife and five children. Jack gives Frankie a goldfish as a preemptive birthday present because he will soon leave again on an extended trip to the United States for another stage production, which will likely cause him to miss Frankie's next birthday. Before leaving, Jack gives Frankie some reassuring advice about his future.

Frankie plans a beach party and fantasizes being with Romy and Jayne on a local beach. Frankie receives a letter from Jack offering further advice, which only confuses him further. When his mother goes out for the night at a political function, Frankie invites a houseful of friends over, but the party fails to entertain because Frankie and his friends neglected to invite any women. One midsummer day, whilst Frankie and a friend attempt to repair the gate his father nearly destroyed, Romy visits to collect donations for the Labour Party. Frankie's mother later warns him to avoid Romy, Jayne, as well as all other Protestant women.

Erin, a visiting teenager from Milwaukee, and her little sister, Rainbow, comes to stay with the family at Jack's invitation. Frankie impresses Erin by playing the guitar at dinner. When Erin admits to seeing Frankie as a mature grown man, his mother denies the possibility. As Frankie begins printing flyers for his beach party, his mother insists that he escort Erin to the cinema. On a public bus, Frankie introduces Erin to Romy and Jayne. At Romy's and Jayne's suggestion, Erin willingly demonstrates a cheerleading routine on the crowded bus, dedicated to Frankie to his embarrassment. Having publicly confessed her love for Frankie, Erin pries at Frankie for his true feelings. After initially rebuffing her, the couple share a passionate kiss. When Erin departs the next day, Frankie is too embarrassed to come out to say goodbye.

Cathleen pressures Frankie to vote illegally in the local election. Instead of actually voting, Frankie scrawls "FUCK YOU" on his ballot and puts it into the ballot box. James Davern is declared the winner later that evening, to Cathleen's delight. Cathleen hosts an impromptu victory party where she serenades Mr. Davern himself. Frankie and Ray serve spiked punch to the attendees. Mr. Davern attempts to seduce Cathleen with flattery and kisses as her sons look on, but he soon passes out from alcohol poisoning.

After arguing with friends about the futility of planning a beach party, Frankie heedlessly wanders into a gorse fire. He succumbs to the smoke but is soon rescued by firemen. When Jayne walks Frankie home, she invites him to play pool. After playing pool, a jealous Romy watches as Jayne takes Frankie home, where they make love. Jayne kicks out the highly enamored, but confused, Frankie, and throws his clothes out the window. On his way home, he learns from a bereft friend that Elvis Presley had died earlier that day. At his mother's insistence to confess to the priest, Frankie makes a mock confession.

The mail arrives with the exam results letter early. Frankie passed his exams after all. When Jack arrives home by taxicab, he has the driver break through the repaired gate. Frankie reconnects with his father, who suggests he throw the beach party in Elvis Presley's honor. At the party, Frankie confesses his love to Romy who then joins him for a walk on the beach.

== Cast ==
- Jared Leto as Frankie Griffin, a teen coping with his age and bizarre family
- Catherine O'Hara as Cathleen, Frankie's extroverted mother
- Gabriel Byrne as Jack, Frankie's father
- Christina Ricci as Erin, a visiting American family friend
- Colm Meaney as Jim Davern, a sleazy politician
- Stephen Rea as Taxi Driver
- Emily Mortimer as Romy Thomas
- Lorraine Pilkington as Jayne Wayne
- Jason Barry as Nelson Fitzgerald

== Release ==
The film premiered at the Galway Film Fleadh, on 11 July 1996. It went on general release in Ireland on 22 November 1996. It grossed £104,249 in its opening week from 32 screens. Unusually three of the top four films at the Irish box office were Irish made, with Michael Collins taking the top spot, The Van second and High Kings coming in fourth place.

== Reception ==
Michael Dwyer of The Irish Times was critical of the "uneven performances" and says that although "the camera loves him, Leto's performance is blandly unremarkable" and that Catherine O'Hara's is "wildly over the top" and her performance capsizes the film. Nathan Rabin of The A.V. Club complains of the renaming of the film to the generic "Summer Fling" title, and describes it as "a pleasant, unpretentious, ultimately uninvolving film that hews so closely to the conventions of the coming-of-age film that it verges on self-parody." Rabin is also critical of the actors, saying "Leto is a washout as the film's wistful protagonist, and O'Hara gives an almost embarrassingly over-the-top performance".

Adam Mars-Jones of The Independent says the film is formulaic but "What saves the film is the director David Keating's light tone -- he seems to be both indulging his audience's nostalgia and gently mocking it" and "It helps that the actor Jared Leto has a permanent twinkle in his eye which suggests that Frankie too realises both the gravity and the absurdity of his initiation into adulthood." Anne Billson of the Sunday Telegraph called it "another slice of Oirish whimsy" and praised it for the incidental pleasures, but criticized for being formless and rambling. Derek Elley of Variety called it "an agreeable cocktail from familiar ingredients".
