= VyRT =

Former on-demand streaming provider

- Website type: Private
- Founded: Los Angeles, California, U.S.
- Area served: Worldwide
- Founder: Jared Leto
- Industry: Internet
- Services: Streaming media, digital distribution, online shopping
- Website: vyrt.com

VyRT was an American provider of on-demand Internet streaming media available to viewers worldwide. The company was established in late 2011 and was headquartered in Los Angeles, California. VyRT was founded by entertainer Jared Leto as a website for hosting online events, but soon diversified into featuring digital distribution and online shopping. It also included social networking.

By 2015, VyRT was receiving 3.5 million requests per minute and had surpassed 5,000 subscribers. Many of its live events became worldwide trending topics.

== History ==
VyRT was established in late 2011 as a startup company by entertainer Jared Leto. His aim was to let musicians create live experiences and broadcast them on the Internet, with the ability to share their work without having to rely on the prevailing sponsor-based model. Its inception came from some frustrating experiences Leto faced with American rock band Thirty Seconds to Mars in streaming their own live events.

On December 7, 2011, VyRT streamed the Tribus Centum Numerarae, the 300th show of the Into the Wild Tour by Thirty Seconds to Mars, which garnered the band the Guinness World Record for most live shows during a single album cycle. The show marked the launch of VyRT as an online platform. At the 2012 O Music Awards in June, it was awarded Best Online Concert Experience.

After the first streamed events, VyRT transitioned to a new site, expanding to digital distribution and online shopping, selling video downloads/streaming, MP3 downloads/streaming, and e-books. It also began to feature social networking. The team rebuilt the website in Ruby on Rails and expanded its capacity on Heroku. An official store featuring merchandise, DVDs, books, and apparel was also launched. The artists featured on VyRT included Gerard Way, Linkin Park, Greek Fire, Ryan Beatty, The Janoskians, Ryan Cabrera, the Jonas Brothers, Boy Epic, Ivy Levan, and Brendan Brazier. Later, it began to stream films, beginning on August 31, 2013 with special screenings of the documentary film Artifact (2012), followed by the psychological horror film The Shining (1980) on February 9, 2014.

In August 2014, it was announced that VyRT would exclusively broadcast worldwide the performance from the Carnivores Tour by Linkin Park and Thirty Seconds to Mars, scheduled on September 15 at the Hollywood Bowl in Los Angeles. Before Thirty Seconds to Mars took to the stage, the VyRT platform was hacked. Jared Leto was forced to delay the performance by Thirty Seconds to Mars by an hour to resolve the issue. The audience eventually lost approximately three minutes of actual stage time, but the set list was shortened. Leto later claimed that a "piracy stream" was responsible. The event included "real-time social community engagement from audiences worldwide".

In November 2014, the documentary series Into the Wild premiered on VyRT. The series was produced by Jared Leto and Emma Ludbrook through the production company Sisyphus Corporation. In May 2015, VyRT premiered episode one of indie pop musician Boy Epic's docuseries Telling Secrets in response to a Mars fan campaign to get him on the platform after he made a song inspired by Suicide Squad (2016). Further episodes weren't released for unknown reasons. On October 9, 2016, Thirty Seconds to Mars exclusively released Camp Mars: The Concert Film on VyRT. The film was directed by Leto, documenting the first Camp Mars event in 2015.

By 2020, VyRT was still open but not receiving new livestreams or VOD content, with the last major livestream being an AT&T sponsored concert live from the third annual Camp Mars event in Malibu on August 12, 2017. The event itself was hosted on AT&T's website and their Facebook Live. An initially planned partnership with Fandor, announced as part of Leto becoming Chief Creative Officer of the platform on May 21, 2017, never came to fruition. Mars fans still used the site to communicate with other fans and host watch parties for VyRT VODs, with some hosted officially by VyRT. In December 2020, the site redirected to a page on the official Thirty Seconds to Mars website formally announcing the end of the platform, thanking the user base and hinting at a new project from the same team.

== Services ==
The VyRT website featured a main page, Live, and Vault, as well as a series of personal pages. The Live sections provided live streaming events as well as social networking. Users logged into their accounts during the broadcast and could chat with others via a live feed. The interaction window allowed users to quote, invite, reply, or find other users' profiles. Artists could also interact with users on the live feed. The Vault sections consisted of all available events for purchase, including streaming and downloads.

Livestreams were traditionally referred to as VyRTs, with ReVyRTs referring to rebroadcasts of livestreams. The service also hosted VyRT Violets, less professionally produced impromptu video chats, similar to what would later become Instagram Live. VyRT didn't utilize proprietary services, instead favoring white label livestreaming platforms, online payment providers, and chat clients. The Bootstrap UI was used to provide an ad-free and easily customizable interface for artists. Ustream was used for the first MARS300 broadcast.

It is unknown if Thirty Seconds to Mars or others that held events on the platform plan to re-release Vault VOD content elsewhere after VyRT's closing.

== See also ==
- List of streaming media systems
