= Jaan Uhelszki =

American music journalist

Jaan Uhelszki (/ˈdʒæn juˈhɛlski/ JAN you-HELL-ski) is an American music journalist and co-founder of the music magazine Creem where she became one of the first women to work in rock journalism. She is a founding editor of Addicted to Noise and writer-at-large for print and online music and news publications. She writes, produces and is featured in music documentaries and is editor-at-large for Creem, relaunched in 2022.

== Early influences ==
Uhelszki grew up in Detroit, Michigan, listening to Motown and FM rock radio, and worked as a "Coke Girl" selling sodas at the Grande Ballroom, which allowed her access to early shows featuring Jimi Hendrix, Cream, The Stooges, the MC5, and Janis Joplin. She started reading The East Village Other and The Village Voice after a trip to New York City when she was fifteen. Articles by Nik Cohn and Michael Thomas inspired her to become a rock critic herself.

== Writing career ==
As a teen studying journalism at Wayne State University, Uhelszki sold T-shirts for the Creem subscription department in 1970. Editor Dave Marsh assigned her to cover Smokey Robinson's retirement from The Miracles press conference. She wrote the piece as an open letter to Robinson, begging him not to leave the music industry. The resulting article, her first, was a 1972 Creem cover story.

She wrote movie columns and feature-length profiles, eventually becoming a senior editor while working alongside fellow writer Lester Bangs. Creem at the time employed what was considered a “dream team” of rock writers, including Uhelszki, Bangs, Marsh, Ben Edmonds, and Roberta Cruger. Uhelszki has described the insular experience of working on a monthly music magazine as “like living on Donkey Island from Pinocchio--only we looked entirely normal.”

=== Articles of note for Creem ===
Uhelszki's feature article "I Dreamed I Was Onstage with KISS in My Maidenform Bra" documents the night she performed in full costume and makeup with the band Kiss—the only rock journalist ever to do so.

Of proposing the story about performing with Kiss, she pointed out:

A man couldn't have done that story. He wouldn't have got the access. Being an underestimated under-gender I got away with things my male counterparts couldn't.

The Kiss experience, which started out as a joke, would go on to influence the rest of her writing career. Performing in full makeup and costume in front of 6,000 people, Uhelszki noted:

I think that experience has impacted everything I've written afterward because I know what it's like to live, if only for five minutes, on the other side. It was an amazing thing for me. I definitely have much more empathy and much more of an understanding of musicians and that thrill, and how hard it is to give up that surge of power you get every night. You understand what it was like to stand in front of people.

She traveled with Lynyrd Skynyrd for a feature article about their second-to-last tour, and was captivated by the late Ronnie Van Zant's spirit, although he told her that he didn't expect to live to see thirty. He would die in a plane crash a year and a half later.

She was able to get a hard-won interview with Jimmy Page, but only after touring with Led Zeppelin for a week and with Page's publicist serving as an “interpreter” asking Uhelszki's questions while Page sat in the same room with them.

In 1976 she left Creem and moved to Los Angeles to work for Record World magazine. She would go on to become founding news editor of online magazine Addicted to Noise before heading up Microsoft Music Central's news department.

=== Current work ===
Uhelszki has been a contributing editor for Rolling Stone Online. She was senior editor at Harp from 2002 to 2008, and presently works as Relix's editor-at-large besides being a regular contributor to UK music magazines Uncut and Classic Rock.

Uhelszki's features have been published in New Musical Express, The Village Voice, Spin, Mojo, Alternative Press, Blender, and the San Francisco Chronicle. She has interviewed and profiled, among others, Al Green, Neil Young, Iggy Pop, Oasis, Thirty Seconds to Mars, Morrissey, and Green Day.

Uhelszki is consulting editor emeritus of Creem, relaunched as an online and print publication in 2022.

== Media work ==
Uhelszki writes liner notes for Sony Legacy Recordings, Rhino Records, and Time-Life.

She has written essays for Rock and Roll Hall of Fame inductees The Pretenders, Lynyrd Skynyrd, Patti Smith, and The Stooges.

Uhelszki regularly appears as a music authority on VH1's “Behind the Music” series, as well as on radio shows and at industry panels and workshops, where she works as a media trainer.

Uhelszki appears in the 2012 documentary, Big Star: Nothing Can Hurt Me, directed by Drew DeNicola and Olivia Mori. In the film, she discusses the first and only Rock Writer's Convention that occurred in 1972 in Memphis, Tennessee, where Big Star performed for a gathering of top rock critics from throughout the U.S. Uhelszki calls the Big Star performance a "seminal experience."

Uhelszki co-wrote and co-produced the 2019 documentary Creem: America’s Only Rock 'n' Roll Magazine. Directed by Scott Crawford, the film chronicles the formation and turbulent history of Creem and how its writers and editors impacted the American music scene throughout the 1970s and early 1980s.

== Personal life ==
She lives with her husband, Matthew King Kaufman, founder of Beserkley Records, in Palm Desert, California.

== Awards and accolades ==
- As head of the news department at Addicted to Noise, Uhelszki won Online Journalist of the Year and the National Feature Writer Award from the Music Journalists Association, 1996.
- Uhelszki is listed in Flavorwire's 33 Women Music Critics You Need to Read, 2011.
