= Collective (BBC) =

- Website type: Music webzine
- Owner: BBC Online
- Website: www.bbc.co.uk/dna/collective
- Registration: No
- Launched: May 2002
- Current status: Offline

Collective was an "interactive culture magazine" hosted by the BBC's website bbc.co.uk and run using the "DNA" software developed for h2g2. It was launched in May 2002 and became interactive four months later. Among its editors were Rowan Kerek, Jonathan Carter, Alastair Lee, James Cowdery and Matt Walton, the magazine's originator. The bulk of its content consisted of weekly reviews and discussion of new music, films, video games and/or books. Like H2G2, Collective included a broad forum element, with considerable user-contributed content and discussion.

Contributors to Collective included artist Billy Childish, Rhianna Pratchett and various freelance journalists such as film reviewer Leigh Singer and film and games journalist Daniel Etherington. Submissions could be made regardless of professional status by anyone who had registered as a member of the magazine. As at h2g2, each member was given a userpage (a "my space") where their contributions and interactions were listed.

Collective's webpages were made dormant in early 2008.
