= A Day in the Life of America =

- Official release poster
- Directed by: Jared Leto
- Produced by: Jared Leto; Emma Ludbrook; Matt Benson
- Edited by: Samuel Nalband; Andy Worboys
- Music by: Thirty Seconds to Mars; Thomas Bonneyrat
- Production companies: Paradox Production; Interscope Films
- Distributed by: PBS (North America)
- Release dates: April 27, 2019 (Tribeca); January 11, 2021
- Running time: 78 minutes
- Country: United States
- Language: English

A Day in the Life of America is a 2019 American documentary film directed by Jared Leto. Shot over the course of 2017 Independence Day, the film depicts glimpses into the diversity and division of the United States. It was conceived as a companion piece to America (2018), the fifth studio album by Leto's rock band Thirty Seconds to Mars.

The film was inspired by the Day in the Life photography books, a series of works by photographer David Elliot Cohen who documented subjects over the course of a single day. To capture footage for the documentary, Leto sent 92 crews to all fifty States of America, plus Washington, D.C., and Puerto Rico, in addition to user-submitted clips from July 4, 2017.

Leto produced the film with Emma Ludbrook, through their production company Paradox, and with Matt Benson through Interscope Films. A Day in the Life of America premiered at the 2019 Tribeca Film Festival to critical acclaim. It had its broadcast premiere on PBS as part of Independent Lens on January 11, 2021.

== See also ==
- List of Independent Lens films
