= Jared Leto =

American actor and musician (born 1971)

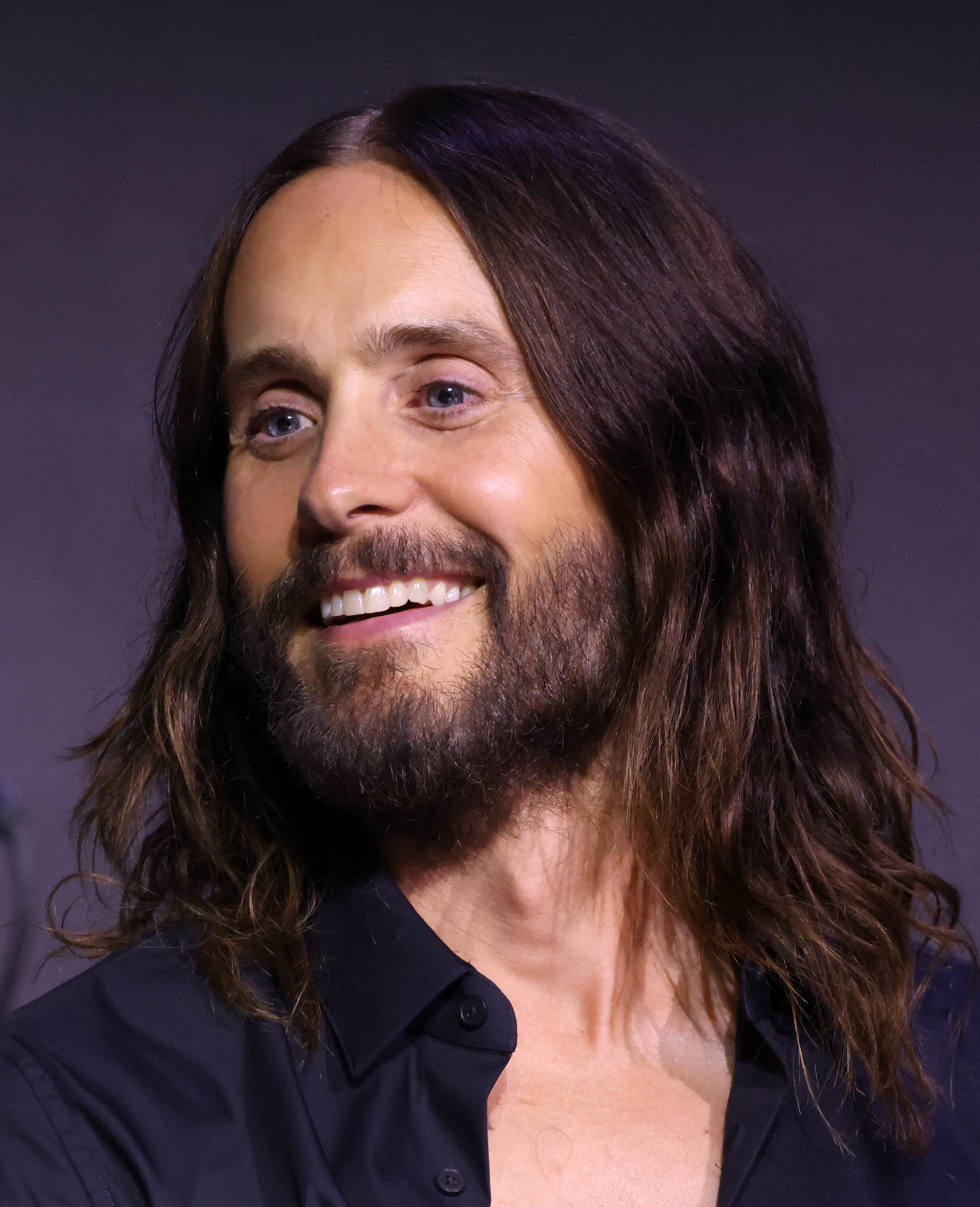
- Leto in 2025
- Born: Jared Joseph Leto; December 26, 1971 (age 54); Bossier City, Louisiana, U.S.
- Other names: Bartholomew Cubbins; Angakok Panipaq
- Education: School of Visual Arts
- Occupations: Actor; musician; singer; songwriter
- Years active: 1992–present
- Works: Filmography; discography; songs
- Relatives: Shannon Leto (brother)
- Awards: Acting; music
- Musical career
- Genre: Alternative rock
- Instruments: Vocals; guitar; bass; keyboards
- Labels: Interscope; Virgin; Immortal
- Member of: Thirty Seconds to Mars
- Website: thirtysecondstomars.com

Jared Joseph Leto (/ˈlɛtoʊ/ LET-oh; born December 26, 1971) is an American actor, singer, songwriter, and musician. Known for his method acting in a variety of roles, he has received various accolades over a career spanning three decades, including an Academy Award and a Golden Globe. He is also the frontman of the rock band Thirty Seconds to Mars.

After beginning his career on the television series My So-Called Life (1994), Leto made his film debut in How to Make an American Quilt (1995) and gained critical attention for his performance in Prefontaine (1997). After supporting roles in The Thin Red Line (1998), Fight Club (1999), Girl, Interrupted (1999) and American Psycho (2000), he received praise for his lead role as a drug addict in Requiem for a Dream (2000). He then began to focus more on music, but returned to acting with Panic Room (2002), Alexander (2004), Lord of War (2005), Chapter 27 (2007), and Mr. Nobody (2009). His performance as a transgender woman in Dallas Buyers Club (2013) won him the Academy Award for Best Supporting Actor. He has since appeared in Suicide Squad (2016), Blade Runner 2049 (2017), The Little Things (2021), House of Gucci (2021), Morbius (2022), Tron: Ares (2025), and Masters of the Universe (2026).

Leto is the lead vocalist, multi-instrumentalist and main songwriter for Thirty Seconds to Mars, a band he formed in 1998 with his older brother Shannon Leto. Its debut album, 30 Seconds to Mars (2002), was released to positive reviews but to limited commercial success. Its second album, A Beautiful Lie (2005), pushed the band into the public eye, and the next releases, This Is War (2009) and Love, Lust, Faith and Dreams (2013), received further critical and commercial success. They were followed by America (2018) and It's the End of the World but It's a Beautiful Day (2023), both of which polarized critics upon release. The band has sold over 15 million albums worldwide.

== Early life and education ==
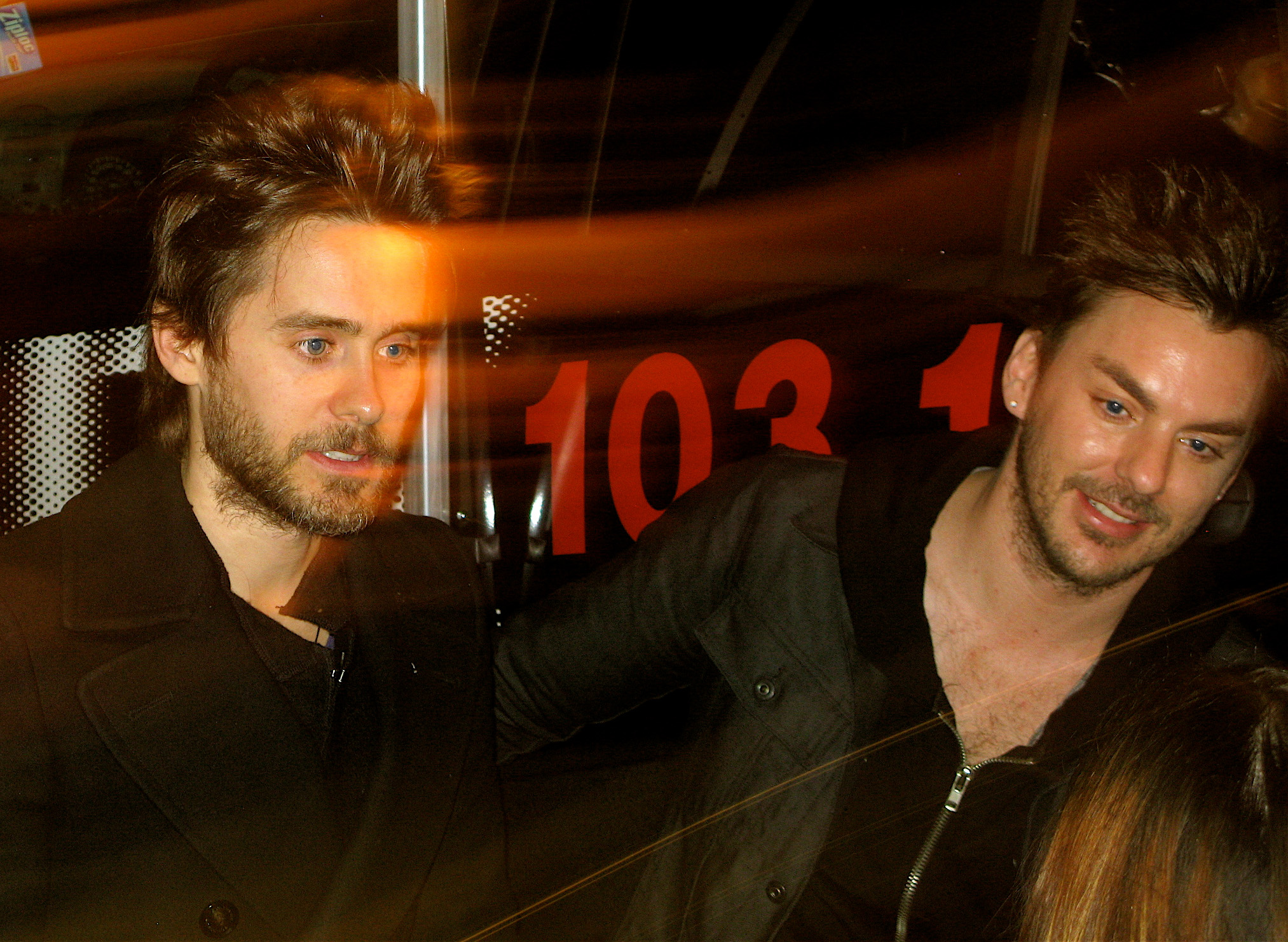
Leto (left) with his brother Shannon in 2009

Jared Joseph Leto was born on December 26, 1971, in Bossier City, Louisiana, to Constance Leto (née Metrejon). His mother has Cajun ancestry. Leto is his stepfather's surname. His parents divorced when he was a child, and he and his older brother, Shannon, lived with their mother and their maternal grandparents, Ruby (Russell) and William Lee Metrejon. After he remarried, his father died by suicide when Jared was eight. Leto moved frequently with his family from Louisiana to different cities around the country. "My mom's father was in the Air Force," Leto has explained, "so moving around a lot was a normal way of life." Leto has two younger half-brothers from his father's second marriage.

Constance joined the hippie movement and encouraged her sons to get involved in the arts. Leto said he "was raised around a lot of artists, musicians, photographers, painters and people that were in theater," adding that "Just having the art communal hippie experience as a child, there wasn't a clear line that was drawn. We celebrated creative experience and creative expression. We didn't try and curtail it and stunt any of that kind of growth." Leto started playing music with his brother at an early age; his first musical instrument was a broken-down piano.

After dropping out briefly in the 10th grade, Leto decided to return and focus on his education at the private Emerson Preparatory School in Washington, D.C. He was interested in large-scale visual art and enrolled at the University of the Arts in Philadelphia. After developing an interest in filmmaking, he transferred to the School of Visual Arts in New York City. While he was a student there, he wrote and starred in his own short film, Crying Joy. He also attended the Corcoran School of the Arts and Design, now a part of George Washington University.

== Career ==
=== 1992–1999: Early acting roles, Prefontaine and Thirty Seconds to Mars ===
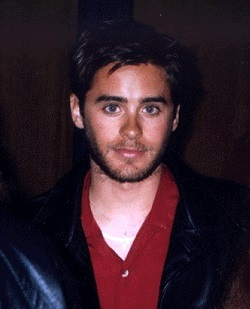
Leto at a press conference for My So-Called Life in 1995

In 1992, Leto moved to Los Angeles to pursue a career in acting. The same year, Leto made his television film debut starring alongside Alicia Silverstone in Cool and the Crazy, and landed his first film role in the 1995 drama How to Make an American Quilt. He later co-starred with Christina Ricci in The Last of the High Kings (1996) and got a supporting role in Switchback (1997).

In 1997, Leto starred in the biopic Prefontaine as Olympic hopeful Steve Prefontaine. To prepare for the role, Leto immersed himself in the runner's life, training for six weeks and meeting with members of his family and friends. He bore a striking resemblance to the real Prefontaine, also adopting the athlete's voice and upright running style. His portrayal received positive reviews from critics and is often considered his breakthrough role. Peter Stack of the San Francisco Chronicle noted: "With hypnotic blue eyes and dirty blond hair, Leto captures the rock-star style Prefontaine affected, and he looks natural in fiery performances on the track, as well as off, where Pre affected a brash, confrontational style."

After landing the lead role of a British aristocrat in the 1998 drama Basil, Leto starred in the horror Urban Legend. It was poorly received by most critics, but was a financial success. That year, Terrence Malick cast Leto for a supporting role in the war film The Thin Red Line alongside Sean Penn and Adrien Brody. It garnered mostly positive reviews and was a moderate success. It received multiple awards and nominations, including seven Academy Award nominations; Leto shared a Satellite Award with the rest of the cast.

Leto formed the rock band Thirty Seconds to Mars in 1998 in Los Angeles, California with his brother Shannon. When the group first started, Jared Leto did not allow his position of Hollywood actor to be used in promotion of the band. Their debut album had been in the works for a couple of years, with Leto writing the majority of the songs. Their work led to a number of record labels being interested in signing Thirty Seconds to Mars, which eventually signed to Immortal Records.

In 1999, Leto played a gay high school teacher who attracts the attention of Robert Downey, Jr.'s character in Black and White, and had a supporting role in the drama Girl, Interrupted, an adaptation of the memoir of the same name by Susanna Kaysen. He then portrayed Angel Face in Fight Club (1999), a film adaptation of Chuck Palahniuk's novel of the same name, directed by David Fincher.

=== 2000–2005: Requiem for a Dream, other roles, Panic Room and A Beautiful Lie ===
Leto played Paul Allen, a rival of Patrick Bateman, in the psychological thriller American Psycho (2000). Though the film polarized audiences and critics, Leto's performance was well received. The same year, he starred as heroin addict Harry Goldfarb in Requiem for a Dream, an adaptation of Hubert Selby, Jr.'s novel of the same name, directed by Darren Aronofsky and co-starring Ellen Burstyn, Jennifer Connelly, and Marlon Wayans. To prepare for his role, Leto lived on the streets of New York City and refrained from having sex for two months prior to shooting. He starved himself for months, losing 28 pounds to realistically play his heroin addict character. After the shooting of the film, Leto moved to Portugal and lived in a monastery for several months to gain weight. His performance received critical acclaim by film critics who notably praised the actor's emotional courage in portraying the character's physical and mental degradation. Peter Travers from Rolling Stone commented that Leto "excels by going beyond Harry's gaunt look to capture his grieving heart. His scenes with Ellen Burstyn as Sara, Harry's widowed mother, achieve a rare poignancy as son and mother drown in delusions."

Leto next appeared in the independent film Highway. Set in 1994, Jack Hayes (Leto) is caught with the wife of his employer, a Vegas thug, and flees to Seattle with his best friend, Pilot Kelvin (Jake Gyllenhaal), in the week preceding Kurt Cobain's suicide. Filming finished in early 2000, but the film was not released until March 2002 on home video formats, although originally scheduled for a theatrical release.

During this period Leto focused increasingly on his music career, working with producers Bob Ezrin and Brian Virtue on his band's debut album 30 Seconds to Mars, which was released on August 27, 2002, in the United States through Immortal and Virgin. It reached number 107 on the US Billboard 200 and number one on the US Top Heatseekers. Upon its release, 30 Seconds to Mars was met with mostly positive reviews; music critic Megan O'Toole felt that the band managed to "carve out a unique niche for themselves in the rock realm." The album was a slow-burning success, and eventually sold two million copies worldwide.

Leto returned to acting in 2002 with the thriller Panic Room, which marked his second teaming with director David Fincher. He played the supporting role of Junior, a burglar who terrorizes Jodie Foster's character Meg Altman. The film was well received by critics and became a financial success, grossing nearly US$200 million worldwide. Leto's next film was the 2004 biographical film Alexander, directed by Oliver Stone. He portrayed Hephaestion, the closest friend of Alexander the Great. The film failed in the United States; Stone attributed its poor reception to disapproval of the depiction of Alexander's bisexuality, but it succeeded internationally, with worldwide revenue of US$167 million.

The following year, Leto starred together with Nicolas Cage in the political crime thriller Lord of War. He played Vitaly, the younger brother of illegal arms dealer Yuri Orlov. The film was officially endorsed by the human rights group Amnesty International for highlighting the arms trafficking by the international arms industry. It was positively received by movie critics and was a moderate commercial success.

It took two years to record Thirty Seconds to Mars' second studio album A Beautiful Lie, with the band traveling to four continents to accommodate Leto's acting career. A Beautiful Lie was released on August 30, 2005, in the United States. It has since been certified platinum by the Recording Industry Association of America (RIAA), and has reached platinum and gold status in several countries, with a sales total of over four million. The band heavily toured in support of the album and played at several major festivals, including Roskilde, Pinkpop, Rock am Ring, and Download.

=== 2006–2008: Lonely Hearts, Chapter 27, and filmmaking ===
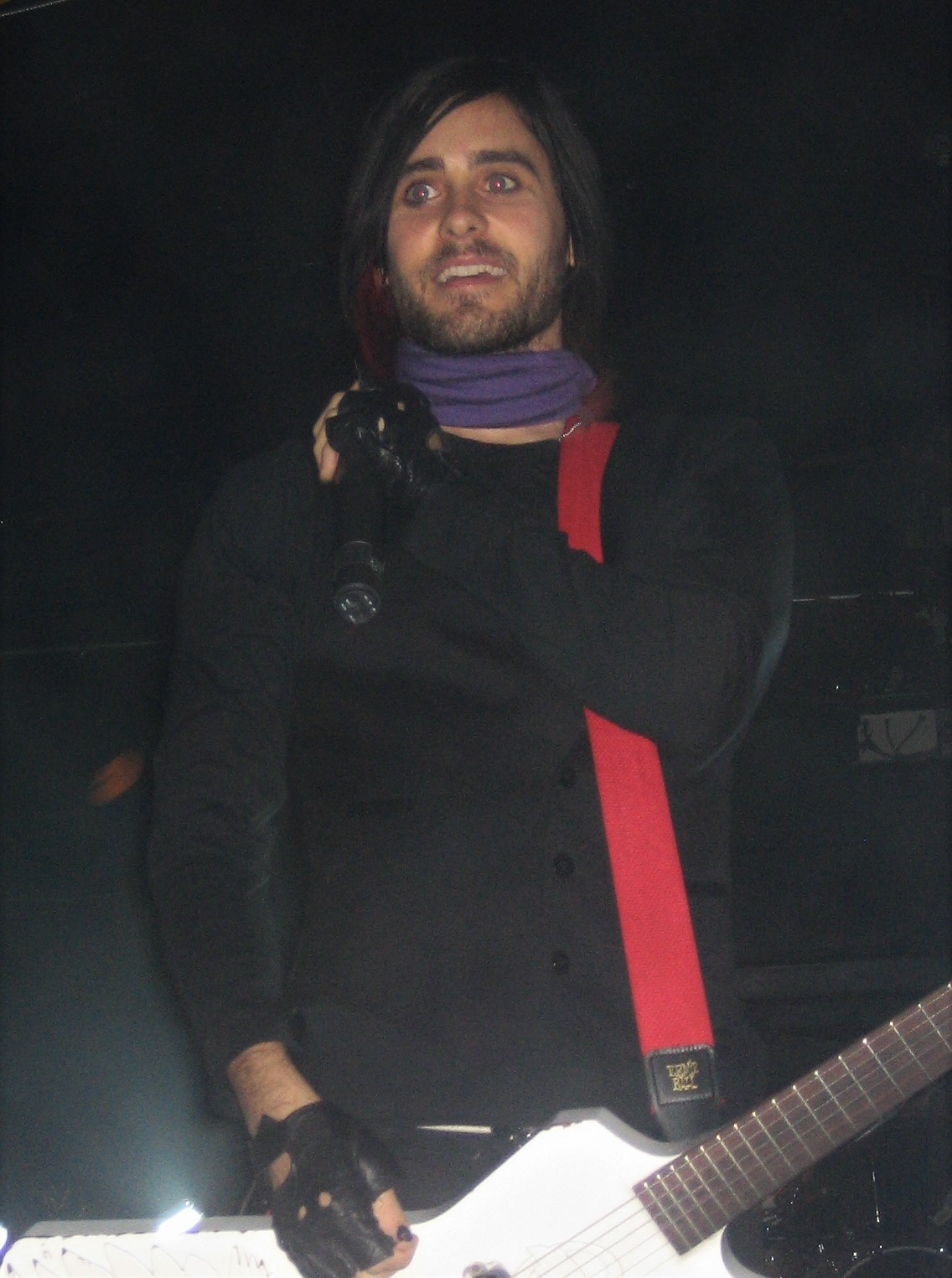
Leto performing in Charlotte, North Carolina in December 2006

In 2006, Leto appeared in the neo-noir crime drama Lonely Hearts, the true story of the notorious "lonely hearts killers" of the 1940s, Raymond Fernandez and Martha Beck. Playing Fernandez, he co-starred with Salma Hayek who played the role of Beck. The film received mixed reviews from critics; however, Leto's acting was widely praised; Heather Huntington from Reelz wrote that his "layered performance as the nattily dressing dandy with no remorse is truly impressive."

Leto served as a narrator for the 2006 television documentary film The Armenian Genocide, broadcast by PBS to spread awareness of the killing of one million Armenians during World War I.

The same year, Leto directed the music video for "The Kill", a song by Thirty Seconds to Mars. At a press release, he stated that an "insanely obnoxious Danish albino" named Bartholomew Cubbins directed the video. He later explained his decision to direct with a pseudonym saying, "I really wanted people to be able to enjoy and experience the video without having any more preconceived notions or distractions, and just to let it be what it was. It wasn't important for me to lay claim to it in that way." Bartholomew Cubbins is a recurring character in the Dr. Seuss universe and one of Leto's favorite characters created by the writer. "The Kill" was inspired by themes of isolation and insanity present in the Stanley Kubrick-directed psychological horror film The Shining (1980). Leto said, "The idea of isolation, identity, and self discovery were all elements present in the song. I thought this light homage was a good starting point and it soon grew to include many more elements outside of Kubrick's original piece." The short film received a largely positive response and numerous accolades, including an MTV Video Music Award. Leto next directed a short film for "From Yesterday". It was filmed in the Forbidden City and became the first ever American music video shot in the People's Republic of China in its entirety. Hundreds of costumed extras were employed for the shoot, inspired by the empires of ancient Chinese dynasties. Leto drew inspiration from Bernardo Bertolucci's historical drama The Last Emperor (1987) as well as the work of Akira Kurosawa.

In 2007, Leto starred in the biographical film Chapter 27. He portrayed Mark David Chapman, a fanatic fan of The Beatles and the murderer of John Lennon. Leto prepared for his role by relying on interviews with Chapman and on audiotapes recorded by a librarian the actor met during a visit to the inmate's hometown. Leto gained 67 pounds to approximate the killer's physique. The abruptness of his weight gain gave him gout. He was forced to use a wheelchair due to the stress the sudden increase in weight put on his body. After the shooting of the film, he quickly went on a liquid diet. Chapter 27 premiered at the 2007 Sundance Film Festival. Despite divided critical opinion on the film as a whole, Leto's performance was widely praised. Owen Gleiberman of Entertainment Weekly considered his acting "a genuine transformation, as the actor submerges himself in Chapman's couch-potato flab and red-rimmed eyes. ... Leto disappears inside this angry, mouth-breathing psycho geek with a conviction that had me hanging on his every delusion."

Leto's next short film was "A Beautiful Lie" (2008), which he directed under the pseudonym of Angakok Panipaq. The music video was filmed 200 miles north of the Arctic Circle in Greenland. Determined to offset the impact that filming would have on the environment, Leto worked with the Natural Resources Defense Council to develop strategies that would minimize fuel consumption on the shoot. Upon release, "A Beautiful Lie" was met with widespread critical acclaim, resulting in various accolades, including the MTV Europe Music Award for Best Video. Proceeds from the video's sales benefited the Natural Resources Defense Council. The same year, Leto remixed a version of the song "The Only One" by The Cure for their extended play Hypnagogic States.

=== 2008–2011: EMI lawsuit, This Is War, and Mr. Nobody ===
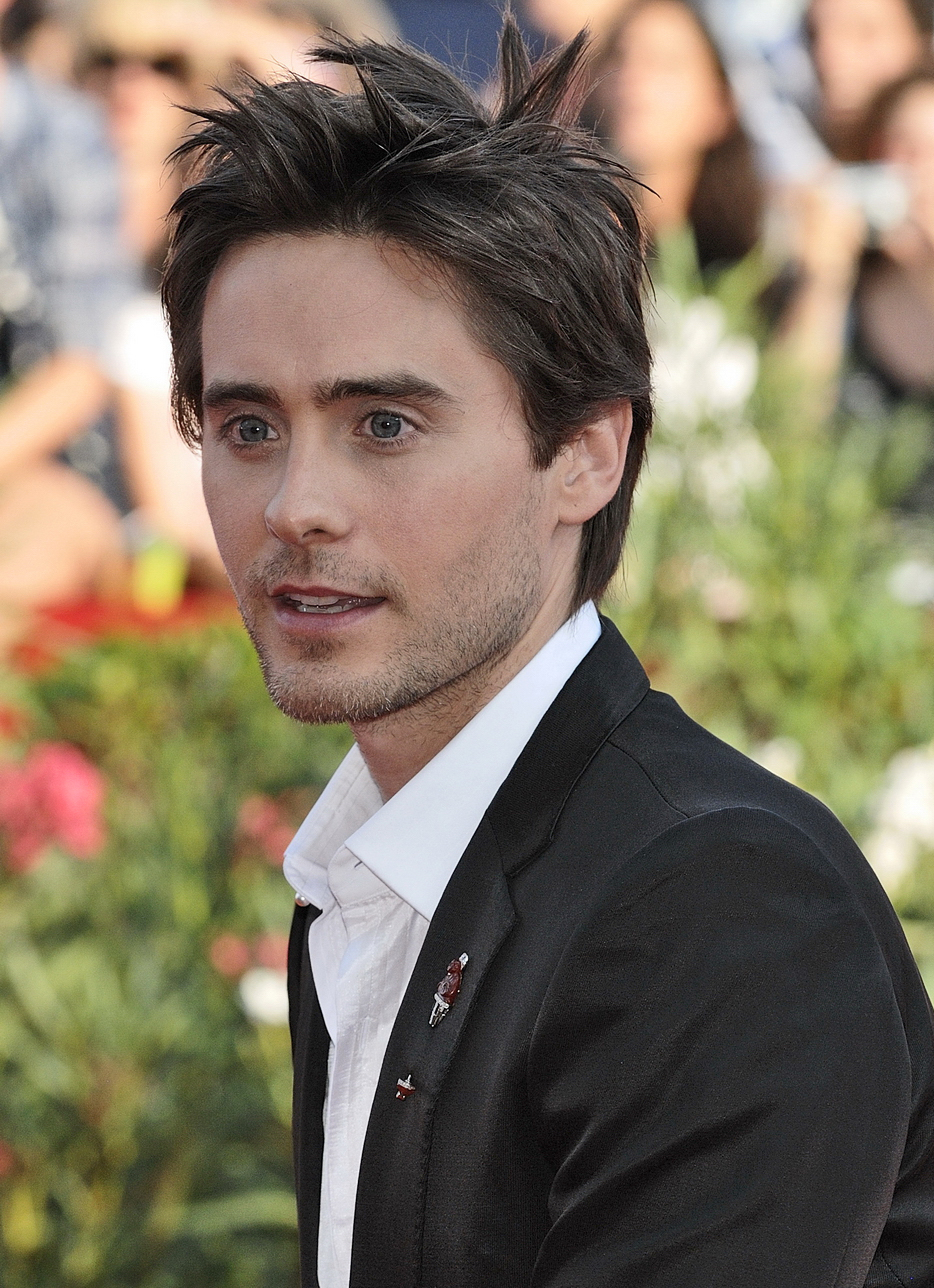
Leto at the premiere of Mr. Nobody at the 66th Venice International Film Festival

In August 2008, during the recording process of their third studio album, Thirty Seconds to Mars attempted to sign with a new label, prompting EMI (the parent label of Virgin), to file a $30 million breach of contract lawsuit. After nearly a year of legal battles, the band announced on April 28, 2009, that the suit had been settled following a defence based on the De Havilland Law. Thirty Seconds to Mars then signed a new contract with EMI and released their third album This Is War in December 2009 to critical acclaim. This Is War reached the top ten of several national album charts and earned numerous music awards.

Leto's next film was the 2009 science fiction drama Mr. Nobody, directed by Jaco Van Dormael. He portrayed the title role of Nemo Nobody, the last mortal on Earth after the human race has achieved quasi-immortality. His role required him to play various versions of his character, from 34 to 118 years old, spending six hours daily for the full make-up and adopting the voice of an old-aged man. Mr. Nobody premiered at the 2009 Venice Film Festival. Critical response praised the film's artistry and Leto's performance. Boyd van Hoeij from Variety felt that "his acting talent really comes into full view in his scenes as the last dying man on Earth. Despite too much old-age makeup, Leto nevertheless infuses the character with some real raw emotional power;" while Bruce Kirkland of Toronto Sun claimed that Leto gave "a marvelously full-blooded, brain-spinning, tour-de-force performance."

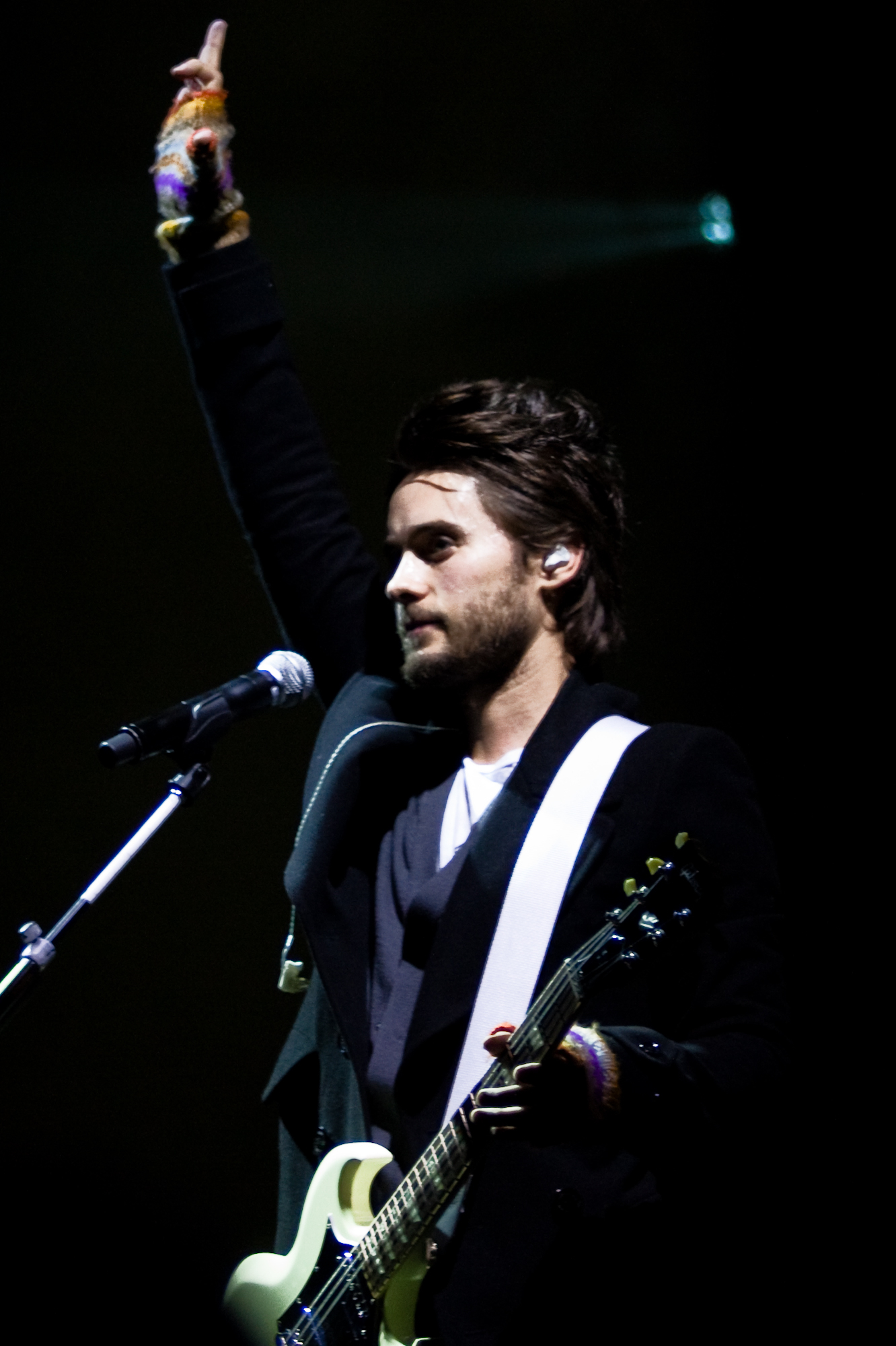
Leto performing in Oakland, California in December 2009

In 2009, Leto recruited scores of extras and all manner of surrealist street performers for the short film of "Kings and Queens", which features a critical mass movement founded with forward-thinking and eco-conscious intentions, through Los Angeles at night. The short film premiered on November 9, 2009, at the Montalban Theater in Los Angeles and was positively received. At the 2010 MTV Video Music Awards, "Kings and Queens" received four nominations, including Video of the Year and Best Direction, and went on to win Best Rock Video. Thirty Seconds to Mars began their Into the Wild Tour in February 2010 and was among the hardest-working touring artists of the year.

Leto filmed "Closer to the Edge" (2010), a short film featuring tour footage, fan commentary and pictures of Thirty Seconds to Mars from their youth, during the band's Into the Wild Tour. Critics lauded the simplicity of the video; James Montgomery from MTV wrote, "there's no denying the power of seeing tens of thousands of fans finding a simultaneous salvation, of a crowd of individuals becoming one. It's what rock and roll is supposed to be about, really: inclusion." In December 2011, Thirty Seconds to Mars entered the Guinness World Records for most live shows during a single album cycle, with 300 shows.

Leto's next project was "Hurricane" (2010), an experimental short film which explores personal demons and unlocking secret fantasies in what is believed to be a dream. Leto filmed it in New York City and described its concept as a "surrealistic nightmare dream-fantasy." Upon release, "Hurricane" garnered controversy and was initially censored due to its elements of violence. At the 2011 MTV Video Music Awards, the short film received three nominations in the categories of Best Direction, Best Cinematography and Best Editing.

=== 2012–2013: Artifact; Love, Lust, Faith and Dreams and Dallas Buyers Club ===
In 2012, Leto made his directorial debut with the documentary film Artifact. It chronicles the modern music business as it charts the legal dispute between Thirty Seconds to Mars and EMI, after the band tried to exit its contract over a royalties dispute. Artifact was made on a limited budget provided by Leto and personal assistant Emma Ludbrook through the production company Sisyphus Corporation. It premiered at the 2012 Toronto International Film Festival where it received the People's Choice Award for Best Documentary. Critics praised the examination of the state of the modern music industry and its focus on the relationship between artists and record companies. The film received a limited theatrical release beginning November 23, 2013, before being released digitally on December 3, 2013.

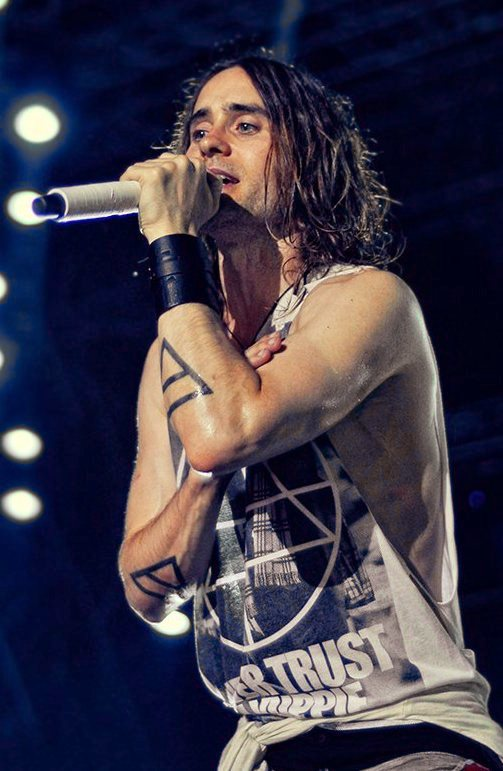
Leto performing in Padova, Italy in July 2013

Thirty Seconds to Mars released their fourth album, Love, Lust, Faith and Dreams, in May 2013 through Interscope Records. The album was produced by Leto with previous collaborator Steve Lillywhite. It received generally positive reviews and reached the top ten in more than fifteen countries, including the United Kingdom and the United States. Leto filmed the 2013 short film for "Up in the Air" at a now-defunct aerospace manufacturing building in Los Angeles, California. He described it as a "bizarre and hallucinogenic journey through an incredibly surreal landscape." The short film features several artists, including burlesque dancer Dita Von Teese, gymnasts McKayla Maroney and Jordyn Wieber, writer Neil Strauss and a number of animals. It garnered several awards, including the MTV Video Music Award for Best Rock Video, and competed at the 2013 Camerimage.

Leto described the concept of his next short film, "Do or Die" (2013), as a companion piece to "Closer to the Edge" (2010). It was filmed during the Love, Lust, Faith and Dreams Tour and features live footage of Thirty Seconds to Mars onstage as well as fan commentary. The same year, Leto directed the critically praised short film for "City of Angels", which premiered on October 12, 2013, at the Hollywood Bowl. The music video features a number of celebrities who join the three members of Thirty Seconds to Mars in sharing their visions about Los Angeles. Multiple monoliths and murals, including Michael Jackson and Marilyn Monroe impersonators, also appear, as well as homeless people hired by Leto himself for the video.

After a five years hiatus from filming, Leto returned to act in the drama Dallas Buyers Club (2013), directed by Jean-Marc Vallée and co-starring Matthew McConaughey. Leto portrayed Rayon, a drug-addicted transgender woman with AIDS who befriends McConaughey's character Ron Woodroof. In order to accurately portray his role, Leto lost 30 pounds, shaved his eyebrows and waxed his entire body. He stated the portrayal was grounded in his meeting transgender people while researching the role. During filming, Leto refused to break character. Dallas Buyers Club received widespread critical acclaim and became a financial success, resulting in various accolades for Leto, who was awarded the Academy Award for Best Supporting Actor, Golden Globe Award for Best Supporting Actor – Motion Picture, Screen Actors Guild Award for Outstanding Performance by a Male Actor in a Supporting Role and a variety of film critics' circle awards for the role.

=== 2014–2021: From Suicide Squad to America ===
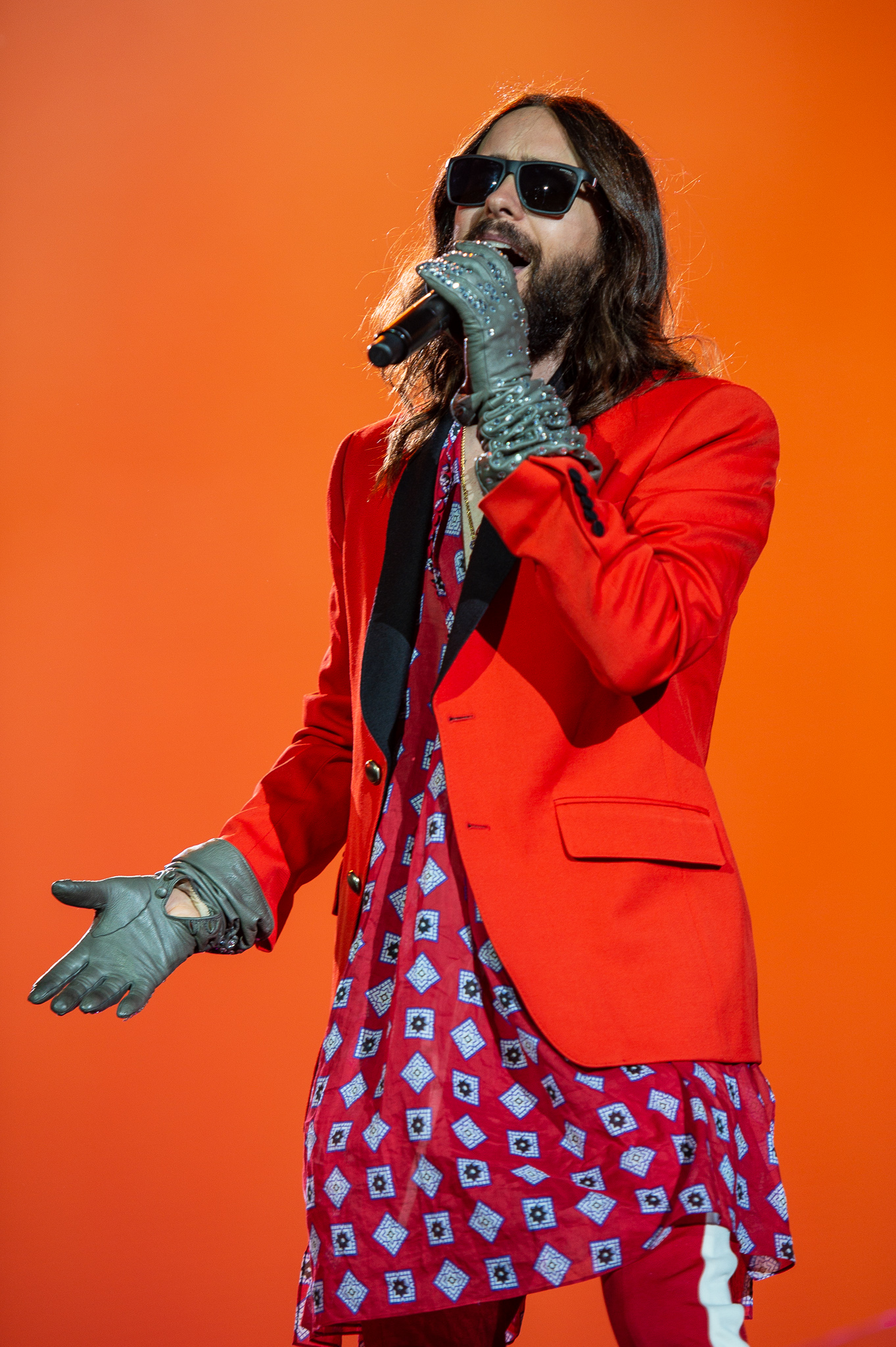
Leto performing at Rock im Park in June 2018

In 2014, Leto premiered the documentary series Into the Wild, which tells the story behind the concert tour of the same name by Thirty Seconds to Mars that propelled the group into arenas around the world and was certified by the Guinness World Records as the longest running tour in the history of rock music. The series was produced by Leto and Emma Ludbrook and was released through the online platform VyRT. On November 3, 2015, it was announced that Thirty Seconds to Mars were working on their fifth studio album.

In December of that year, Warner Bros. confirmed that Leto would play the role of the Joker in Suicide Squad (2016), a supervillain film based on the comic book series of the same name. Leto received some attention for his method acting during the film's production. Fellow Suicide Squad cast member Will Smith, who played Deadshot in the film, stated that he had "never actually met Jared Leto", saying, "We worked together for six months and we've never exchanged a word outside of 'action!' and 'cut!' We've never said 'hello,' we've never said 'good day.' I've only ever spoken to him as Deadshot and him as the Joker. I literally have not met him yet... Not a single word exchanged off-camera. He was all in on the Joker."

Leto's method acting on Suicide Squad also reportedly involved sending unorthodox gifts to his fellow cast members, including live rats and bullets. His co-star Margot Robbie, who played the Joker's girlfriend and accomplice Harley Quinn, said that he gifted her a live rat, which she stated she kept as a pet until her landlord discovered it. Speaking with Vanity Fair, Viola Davis, who played Amanda Waller, stated, "He did some bad things, Jared Leto did. He gave some really horrific gifts. He had a henchman who would come into the rehearsal room, and the henchman came in with a dead pig and plopped it on the table, and then he walked out. And that was our introduction into Jared Leto." In an interview with E! News at the film's premiere in 2016, Leto claimed that he also sent anal beads and used condoms to his co-stars, stating, "I did a lot of things to create a dynamic, to create an element of surprise, of spontaneity, and to really break down any kind of walls that may be there. The Joker is somebody who doesn't really respect things like personal space or boundaries."

In a 2021 interview with Entertainment Weekly, Leto claimed that the comments he made at Suicide Squad's premiere were "in jest", and stated that, "there were no used condoms [...] Any of the very few gifts that were ever given were given with a spirit of fun and adventure and received with laughter, fun, and adventure. It's all filmed! They filmed it all! People were dying. We were just having a goof." Regarding the rat he reportedly gave Robbie, he stated, "The only gifts I ever gave Margot were cupcakes. I think I gave her a mouse, and some of the other guys got gifts that you'd get as a joke at a party." He also added, "I'm an artist at the end of the day. If I do something risky and you don't like it, basically, you can kiss my ass."

Suicide Squad opened to generally negative reviews from critics, but Leto's performance received some praise from critics despite his character's limited screen time. Following the film's release, Leto expressed interest in reprising his role as the Joker in future DC Extended Universe instalments. In October 2020, it was reported that Leto would reprise his role of the Joker in Zack Snyder's Justice League.

In April 2016, it was announced that Leto would appear in the film The Outsider (2018), directed by Martin Zandvliet. In August 2016, Thirty Seconds to Mars revealed they had signed to Interscope Records and confirmed that they were working on new music. That same month Leto was cast as the villain Niander Wallace in the 2017 film Blade Runner 2049, the sequel to Blade Runner. Leto later also appeared in 2036: Nexus Dawn, a promotional short film that takes place before Blade Runner 2049 directed by Luke Scott and co-starring Benedict Wong.

From May to September 2017, Thirty Seconds to Mars embarked on a North American tour with Muse and PVRIS. Thirty Seconds to Mars then performed at the 2017 MTV Video Music Awards featuring special guest Travis Scott. During the ceremony, Jared Leto received media attention for his tribute to musicians Chester Bennington and Chris Cornell, who both died earlier that year. In February 2018, the band officially announced the Monolith Tour with Walk the Moon, Misterwives, K. Flay, Joywave, and Welshly Arms. Thirty Seconds to Mars later confirmed America as title of their fifth album, which was released on April 6, 2018. The album received polarized reviews from critics and debuted at number two on the Billboard 200, becoming the band's highest entry on the chart. It was promoted with an accompanying documentary film, A Day in the Life of America, directed by Leto and released in January 2021 to general praise.

=== 2021–2025: From The Little Things to Tron: Ares ===
Leto played suspected serial killer Albert Sparma in John Lee Hancock's 2021 film The Little Things. The film earned him nominations for a Golden Globe Award and Screen Actors Guild Award—both for Best Supporting Actor. Leto portrays fashion designer and business magnate Paolo Gucci in Ridley Scott's biographical crime drama film House of Gucci, for which he was nominated for a Satellite Award, Critics' Choice Movie Award and Screen Actors Guild Award.

He plays Adam Neumann alongside Anne Hathaway in Apple+'s 2022 WeCrashed about the rise and fall of the WeWork, for which he was nominated for a Best Actor in a Miniseries, Limited Series, or Motion Picture Made for Television. In November 2017, Sony Pictures announced plans for a film adaptation of Morbius, the Living Vampire, which is part of Sony's Spider-Man Universe. On June 27, 2018, it was announced that Leto would star, and Daniel Espinosa would direct. The film was released on 1 April 2022. On July 30, 2022, it was announced that Leto would star in a film directed by Justin Simien titled Haunted Mansion for Disney. The film was released on July 28, 2023. On November 9, 2023, he became the first person to legally scale the Empire State Building. He did this to promote his upcoming worldwide tour Seasons Tour.

Leto starred as the character Ares in Tron: Ares, a new installment in the Tron franchise, by Walt Disney Studios Motion Pictures. In November 2024, it was announced that Leto was cast in the crime film Lunik Heist for Searchlight Pictures.

=== 2026: Masters of the Universe and beyond ===
On December 20, 2024, it was announced that Leto was cast as Skeletor in the Masters of the Universe reboot. The film was released in the United States on June 5, 2026, by Amazon MGM Studios, and internationally by Sony Pictures Releasing International.

== Other work ==
=== Business ventures ===
In 2011, Leto launched the online platform VyRT. Created as a live video streaming service, it also features social networking and official merchandise. Its idea came from some frustrating experiences Leto faced with Thirty Seconds to Mars in streaming their own live events. In June 2012, VyRT was awarded Best Online Concert Experience at the O Music Awards. In 2012, Leto became an investor in Surf Air, a California-based air service. He is also a funder for Reddit, Robinhood Markets, and Aetherflux.

=== Political views ===
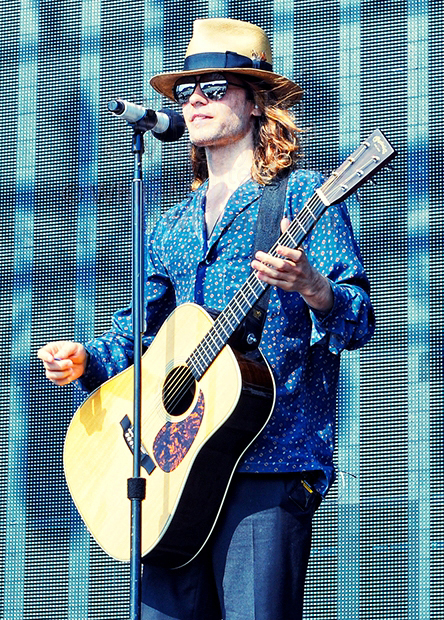
Leto in July 2013

In 2008, Leto supported the California Proposition 2 regarding the treatment of farm animals. In the 2008 presidential election, Leto supported Senator Barack Obama of Illinois. In 2012, he chaired a Gen44 event, a campaign set up by Obama to energize voters under 40.

Leto is a gay rights activist. In October 2009, he raised money for the campaign against California Proposition 8, created by opponents of same-sex marriage to overturn the California Supreme Court decision that had legalized same-sex marriage. He spoke out in support of the LGBT rights group Freedom Action Inclusion Rights (FAIR).

== Personal life ==
Leto began dating actress Cameron Diaz in 1999; they became engaged in 2000 but split up in 2003. Leto became a teetotaler in 2007.

Jared Leto is vegetarian. People for the Ethical Treatment of Animals (PETA) named Elliott Page and Leto the Sexiest Vegetarians of 2014.

=== Sexual misconduct allegations ===
In June 2025, Air Mail published a report in which nine women accused Leto of sexual misconduct, with one allegation dating back to 2006. In July 2026, several more accusers came forward in a BBC Three documentary, Jared Leto: Hollywood's Dark Secret, saying they had been abused as teenagers by Leto. The women accused him of sexual assault, grooming behavior, and attempting to silence them using non-disclosure agreements. The BBC stated it had corroborated these accounts by reviewing photos and messages and interviewing friends and family members of the accusers. Leto has denied these allegations, calling them "categorically false". No police report or formal complaint has been filed in connection with them.

== Selected credits ==
- Prefontaine (1997)
- Urban Legend (1998)
- The Thin Red Line (1998)
- Fight Club (1999)
- American Psycho (2000)
- Requiem for a Dream (2000)
- Panic Room (2002)
- Alexander (2004)
- Lord of War (2005)
- Lonely Hearts (2006)
- Chapter 27 (2007)
- Mr. Nobody (2009)
- Dallas Buyers Club (2013)
- Suicide Squad (2016)
- Blade Runner 2049 (2017)
- The Little Things (2021)
- Zack Snyder's Justice League (2021)
- House of Gucci (2021)
- Morbius (2022)
- Haunted Mansion (2023)
- Tron: Ares (2025)
- Masters of the Universe (2026)

== Discography ==
Thirty Seconds to Mars studio albums

- 30 Seconds to Mars (2002)
- A Beautiful Lie (2005)
- This Is War (2009)
- Love, Lust, Faith and Dreams (2013)
- America (2018)
- It's the End of the World but It's a Beautiful Day (2023)

== See also ==
- List of actors with Academy Award nominations
- List of awards and nominations received by Jared Leto
