= Solon Bixler =

American indie rock musician

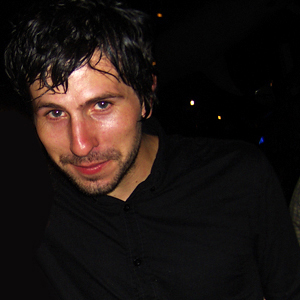
- Solon Bixler, in August 2007 in San Diego

Background information
- Born: January 4, 1977 (age 49); Fresno, California, U.S.
- Genres: Alternative rock; indie rock
- Instruments: Vocals; guitar; bass; keyboards; drums; percussion
- Years active: 1992–present
- Member of: Great Northern
- Formerly of: Thirty Seconds to Mars; Earlimart

Solon Ben Bixler (born January 4, 1977) is an American indie rock musician. He was the guitarist for the bands Thirty Seconds to Mars (2001–2003) and Earlimart. He is currently the lead male vocal and guitar player in the band Great Northern.

== Early life ==
He was born Solon Ben Bixler to a musically inclined family, whose musical past included a band called The Wild Blue Yonder, which included his parents and uncle. Solon started to play drums at the age of four.

Music was heavily involved in Solon and his brother's lives. His mother died in the late 1980s. His father later remarried and had another child.

== Music ==
In 2001, Solon joined Thirty Seconds to Mars playing guitar. He left the band in 2003 due to issues related to touring. Since 30 Seconds to Mars, Solon has played in a revolving array of bands such as All Smiles, Earlimart and Sea Wolf.

Over the years Solon and Rachel Stolte had been trading music recorded on their own four-track recorders. Eventually this led to creation of Great Northern. Solon, in order to get a band together, asked Davey Latter to join. Latter originally played bass guitar but later moved to drums when Ashley Dzerigian joined.
