= Artifact (film) =

- Theatrical release poster
- Directed by: Jared Leto (as Bartholomew Cubbins)
- Produced by: Jared Leto; Emma Ludbrook
- Starring: Jared Leto; Shannon Leto; Tomo Miličević
- Edited by: Stefanie Visser; Daniel Hernandez; Ishai Setton
- Music by: Thirty Seconds to Mars
- Production company: Sisyphus Corporation
- Distributed by: FilmBuff
- Release dates: September 14, 2012 (TIFF); December 3, 2013
- Running time: 103 minutes
- Country: United States
- Language: English

Artifact is a 2012 American documentary film directed by Jared Leto under the pseudonym of Bartholomew Cubbins. It was produced by Leto and Emma Ludbrook through their production company Sisyphus. Artifact chronicles the modern music business as it charts the legal dispute between Leto's rock band Thirty Seconds to Mars and record label EMI, which filed a $30 million breach of contract lawsuit against them in 2008, after the band tried to exit its contract over a royalties dispute. Thirty Seconds to Mars is shown working with producer Flood to create the 2009 album This Is War, meeting with lawyers between recording sessions.

Artifact had its world premiere at the 2012 Toronto International Film Festival where it received the People's Choice Award for Best Documentary. Critics praised the examination of the state of the modern music industry and its focus on the relationship between artists and record companies. The film received a limited theatrical release beginning November 23, 2013, before being released digitally on December 3, 2013.

== Synopsis ==
The film follows rock band Thirty Seconds to Mars as they first learn of and then begin to fight a $30 million lawsuit brought by record label EMI. At the time, they had been writing songs in preparation for the follow-up to their 2005 album A Beautiful Lie. For the bulk of the film, the band, consisting of Jared Leto, his brother Shannon Leto, and Tomo Miličević, is shown working with producers Flood and Steve Lillywhite to create what would eventually become This Is War. Between recording sessions, they meet with lawyers to negotiate for the band's survival.

Beyond the band's specific legal issues and insight into the making of the new album, the film also examines the state of the modern music industry as a whole, focusing on the complex relationships between major labels and their artists. Other musicians give their first-hand accounts of their own experiences in the business. The logistics and economics of how a record company works are explained by music industry insiders, including former EMI employees, music producers and music journalists. They trace the impact of the growing American economic recession on the industry, wherein many companies were taken over by larger groups who thought they could save them. In this instance, Terra Firma Capital Partners sought to rescue EMI despite having little experience in music management.

Meanwhile, Thirty Seconds to Mars are also shown struggling with larger questions of art, money, and integrity. Vignettes in this vein include "people talking about everything from love, art, war, the state of the music industry, and the world." Participants include Irving Azoff, Bob Lefsetz, technologist Daniel Ek (founder of music streaming service Spotify), Bob Ezrin, Neil Strauss, as well as musicians Chester Bennington in his final film, Brandon Boyd, and Serj Tankian. Daniel Levitin, neuroscientist and author of the popular science book This Is Your Brain On Music, also appears, as do the Leto brothers' mother Constance and a family friend.

== Background ==
Despite selling millions of albums, Thirty Seconds to Mars found themselves more than a million dollars in debt to EMI, the parent label of Virgin Records, to which the band was signed at the time. The band also said that they had made no profit from the album sales. In reaction to this, in August 2008, the band attempted to sign with a new label after completing the A Beautiful Lie tour. This in turn prompted EMI to file a lawsuit stating that the band had failed to produce three of the five records they were obligated to deliver under their 1999 contract. Thirty Seconds to Mars responded to the suit by stating that under California law, where the group is based and had originally signed its deal (which Virgin had entered into with the by-then-defunct Immortal Records), one cannot be bound to a contract for more than seven years. The band had been contracted for nine years, so they decided to exercise their legal right to terminate "our old, out-of-date contract, which, according to the law, is null and void."

In a statement, an EMI spokesperson maintained that the label had been forced to take procedural, legal steps in order to protect their investment and rights during contract renegotiations initiated by the band and management. However, Thirty Seconds to Mars also expressed dissatisfaction with the then-recent Terra Firma takeover of EMI, as most of the employees the band had worked with were fired as a result of a major restructuring under TF chairman Guy Hands. The band were among several of the label's artists, unhappy with the transition, who quickly tried to terminate their contracts; the list also included The Rolling Stones and Paul McCartney. Former EMI executives gave interviews describing how the sale resulted in massive upheaval and staff cuts.

After nearly a year of legal battles, Thirty Seconds To Mars announced on April 28, 2009, that the suit had been settled. The suit was resolved following a defence based on a contract case involving actress Olivia de Havilland decades before. Jared Leto explained, "The California Appeals Court ruled that no service contract in California is valid after seven years, and it became known as the De Havilland Law after she used it to get out of her contract with Warner Bros." Thirty Seconds to Mars then signed a new contract with EMI. Leto said that the band had "resolved our differences with EMI" and the decision had been made because of "the willingness and enthusiasm by EMI to address our major concerns and issues, [and] the opportunity to return to work with a team so committed and passionate about Thirty Seconds to Mars." After the suit's resolution, Nick Gatfield, EMI Music's president of A&R labels for North America and the United Kingdom, stated, "We are thrilled to have set aside our differences and signed a new agreement with Thirty Seconds to Mars. Our relationship has been extremely rewarding and successful, and we're eager to move forward and put our global team to work."

== Production ==
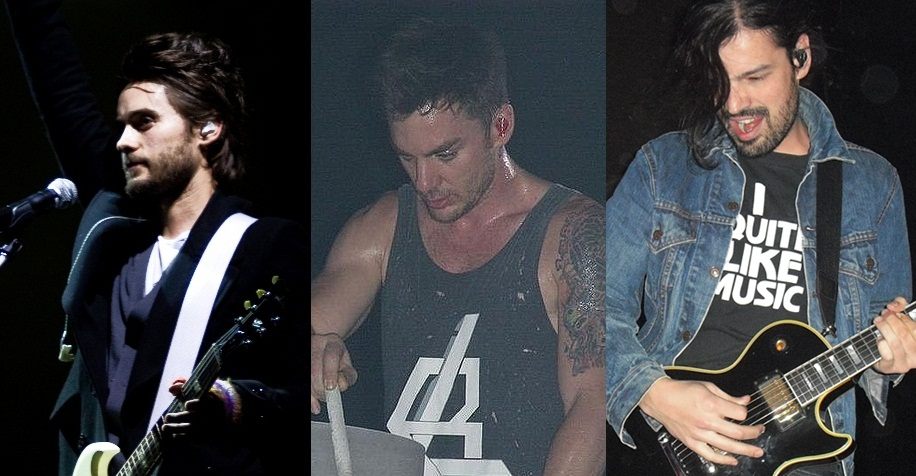
Thirty Seconds to Mars: Jared Leto, Shannon Leto, Tomo Miličević

Artifact was made on a limited budget provided by Leto and producing partner Emma Ludbrook through the production company Sisyphus Corporation. It was shot digitally and filmed in various parts of Los Angeles, California, beginning with the advent of Thirty Seconds to Mars' legal struggles in August 2008. Four camera operators taped more than 3,000 hours of raw footage involving the band, ending in 2009 with the lawsuit's resolution and the subsequent release of their new album. The footage included real-life recording sessions and legal meetings. The final film was produced by Ludbrook and Leto, who also made his directorial debut under his longtime pseudonym Bartholomew Cubbins. Shelby Siegel served as supervising editor. The film's soundtrack features songs by Thirty Seconds to Mars, with additional music provided by Cliff Martinez and Maya Arulpragasam.

Given the band's successful use of the De Havilland Law, Leto contacted actress Olivia de Havilland, but she declined to participate on-camera, although she did agree to meet with him.

The film was initially planned as a documentary about Thirty Seconds to Mars' creative process while recording their next album, but upon the advent of the lawsuit, was retooled as a documentary about making that album in the face of a legal battle that might prevent it from being released. Leto described the film as "a really special, DIY project." He explained, "We all shared a part of our lives that we've never shared on-screen before, a very intimate and personal part of our lives. We take you ... inside the studio, and in our hearts, and in our minds, to share how difficult this point is in our lives—just battling this massive corporation, and fighting for what we believe in." Upon the film's release, Leto told Rolling Stone that "I hope that artists and audiences watch this film and get a greater understanding of how things work [in the record industry], because understanding is the beginning of change."

== Release ==
Artifact premiered at the 2012 Toronto International Film Festival on September 15. It was later screened on November 8, 2012 at the opening night of the DOC NYC, a New York City documentary festival. In November 2012, it was announced that The Works International had picked up international sales for the film. On November 26, 2012, Artifact received the Audience Award at the 22nd Gotham Independent Film Awards. On March 13, 2013, the film was screened at the South by Southwest. It also appeared at the Melbourne International Film Festival on August 9, 2013. Thirty Seconds to Mars held a special screening of Artifact on August 31, 2013 on the online platform VyRT.

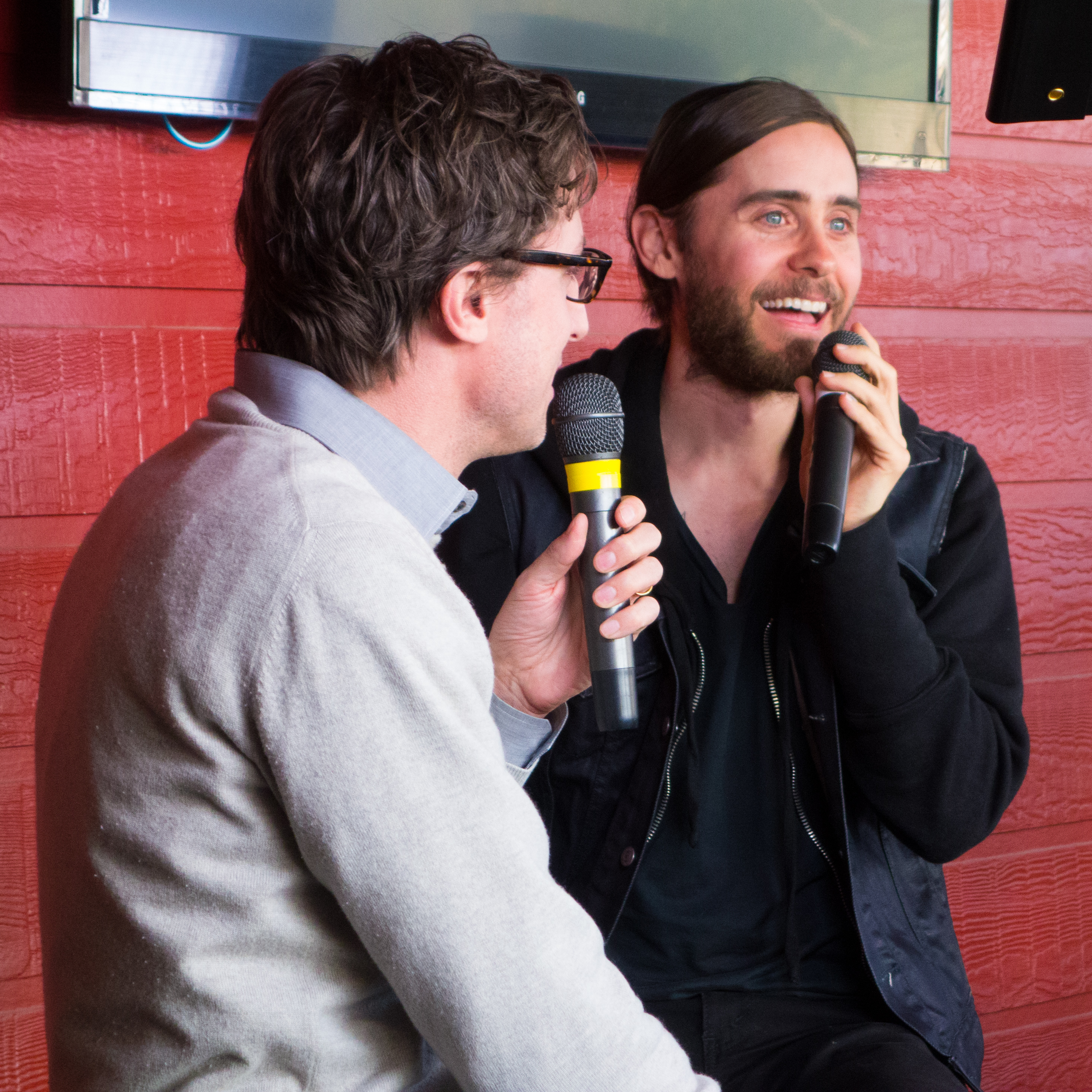
Leto promoting Artifact at the South by Southwest in March 2013

The film was released on DVD in September 2013 through VyRT. It received a worldwide theatrical release beginning November 23, 2013. FilmBuff released the film to digital retailers and video on demand services on December 3, 2013. At the end of 2013, Artifact was included among the iTunes Movies Indie Hits of 2013. In February 2014, BBC Worldwide picked up international television rights to distribute the film.

== Reception ==
Upon its premiere at the 2012 Toronto International Film Festival, Artifact was favorably received by critics and audiences for its look inside the state of the modern recording industry. It received a standing ovation and won the People's Choice Award for Best Documentary. Jason Gorber, writing for Twitch Film, described Artifact as an interesting film "asking a number of important questions about the commerce of art, and does so in an engaging way." Film critic Kenji Lloyd awarded Artifact five stars out of five and called it "one of the greatest music documentaries ever made, and an important documentary for our times." He felt that the film "gives an honest, frank, and inside look at the antiquated system that bands are faced with when they're attached to a major label." Allan Tong of Filmmaker wrote that Leto "does a fine job (with his editors) of weaving the lawsuit with interviews from rock journalists and former EMI executives." Samantha Stott from The New Transmission felt that "Artifact is one of the most honest pieces of work about the industry to have ever been made. It is a real credit to everyone involved and that shared their opinions, views and insights."

Ann Hornaday of The Washington Post praised the film, describing it as enlightening and engaging. Francesca McCaffery of BlackBook commented that the film "highlights the creative challenges of making art in a way that many documentaries often aspire to, but rarely achieve." She also praised Leto's direction. Film critic Mike McGranaghan awarded the film three and a half out of four stars and wrote, "Artifact is a fascinating documentary because it pulls back the curtain on the music business." He said that the film works both as an "accounting of a good band making an album during a bad time" and as an "indictment of a business practice that screws the people who actually make the product." Natalie Robehmed from Forbes stated that the film "vitriolically breaks down what Leto considers to be grave imbalances, showing in one infographic how label contracts can result in bands accumulating debt with every release thanks to promotional costs, recording bills and advances record labels recoup." Isabel Cupryn from Criticize This! gave the film four stars out of five and called it the Super Size Me of the music industry.
