= Gucci (surname) =

Gucci (/ˈɡuːtʃi/ GOO-chee, Italian: [ˈɡuttʃi]) is an Italian surname derived as a variant of Uguccione. Notable people with the surname include:

- Alexandra Gucci Zarini (born 1985), children's rights activist
- Aldo Gucci (1905–1990), Italian businessman and fashion designer
- Guccio Gucci (1881–1953), Italian businessman and fashion designer
- Mateo Gucci (1500–1550), Renaissance architect
- Maurizio Gucci (1948–1995), Italian businessman
- Niccolò Gucci (born 1990), Italian footballer
- Paolo Gucci (1931–1995), Italian businessman and fashion designer
- Patricia Gucci (born 1963), Italian businesswoman
- Patrizia Gucci (née Reggiani, born 1948), ex-wife of Maurizio Gucci, later hirer of his murder
- Rodolfo Gucci (1912–1983), Italian actor and entrepreneur

== See also ==
- Gucci (disambiguation)
- Guccio, a given name and surname
- Ugo (given name), a given name
