= Domenico De Sole =

Italian businessman, chairman of Tom Ford International

- Born: 1944 (age 81–82); Rome, Italy
- Education: Sapienza University of Rome; Harvard Law School
- Occupations: Chairman, Tom Ford International
- Spouse: Eleanore Leavitt De Sole
- Children: 2 daughters

Domenico De Sole (born 1944) is an Italian businessman, chairman of Tom Ford International, current director of Acamar Partners, former chairman of Sotheby's, and former president and CEO of Gucci Group.

== Early life ==
Domenico De Sole was born in Rome, Italy in 1944, the son of a Royal Italian Army General. He graduated from the Sapienza University of Rome in 1970 with a law degree, and then received a scholarship for Harvard Law School, where he received an LL.M. degree in 1972.

== Career ==
De Sole worked for leading U.S. law firms before becoming a partner at the Washington DC firm Patton, Boggs & Blow, specializing in tax law. One of his clients in the early 1980s was Gucci, where he helped with corporate restructuring, and Rodolfo Gucci, a son of the founder Guccio Gucci, enticed De Sole to join in 1984 as CEO of Gucci America.

De Sole was president and CEO of Gucci Group from 1994 to 2004. During his tenure De Sole guided the brand from near bankruptcy to a luxury conglomerate that included Yves Saint Laurent, Bottega Veneta, Balenciaga, Alexander McQueen, Stella McCartney, and Sergio Rossi. De Sole has been chairman of Tom Ford International since the company was founded in 2005.

In March 2015, De Sole became chairman of the international auction house Sotheby's, working alongside president and CEO, Tad Smith, whose appointment was announced on the same day. De Sole stepped down November 2019 following the sale of the company.

De Sole serves on the Boards of Pirelli and Ermenegildo Zegna. He has previously served as a director of Gap Inc., Telecom Italia, Bausch & Lomb, Delta Air Lines, Newell Brands, and Procter & Gamble.

== Personal life ==
De Sole and his wife Eleanore Leavitt De Sole live on Hilton Head Island in South Carolina. Eleanore De Sole has served on the boards of the Savannah College of Art and Design, Georgia, and the Aspen Art Museum, Colorado.

They have two daughters. Laura De Sole, Global Product Marketing Vice President at The Estée Lauder Companies, married Benjamin Baccash in 2013. Eleanore Richards "Rickie" De Sole, Executive Fashion Director of Vogue.com, married Derek Webster in 2012.

In 2016, the De Soles sued the Knoedler gallery, New York, for selling them a fake Mark Rothko painting.

== In popular culture ==
In the 2021 film House of Gucci, directed by Ridley Scott, De Sole was portrayed by actor Jack Huston.
