= Patrizia Gucci =

Italian designer and painter (born 1956)

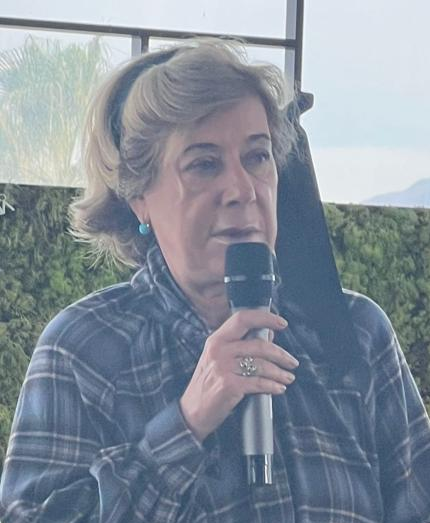
- Gucci in December 2025
- Born: Patrizia Yvonne Gucci; 14 July 1956 (age 69); Florence, Italy
- Occupations: Designer; painter; writer
- Father: Paolo Gucci
- Relatives: Aldo Gucci (grandfather); Guccio Gucci (great-grandfather); Patricia Gucci (half-aunt); Rodolfo Gucci (great-uncle); Maurizio Gucci (first cousin once removed); Alexandra Gucci Zarini (half-cousin)
- Website: www.patriziagucci.com

Patrizia Yvonne Gucci (born 14 July 1956) is an Italian fashion and interior designer, painter, and author. She is the great-granddaughter of Guccio Gucci, the founder of the fashion house Gucci, and the daughter of Paolo Gucci, who was the chief designer for the family company. She herself worked in the public relations department of the family company for 12 years, until 1994.

Gucci is the author of several books, previously had her own accessories brand for the Japanese market, and has held various international exhibitions for her paintings, including at the Opera Gallery in Budapest. She has also decorated the presidential suite at the Four Seasons in Istanbul.

== Early life and education ==
Gucci grew up in Florence with her parents Paolo and Yvonne and her elder sister Elisabetta. She was heavily influenced by her family's fashion business during her upbringing and worked extra in the Gucci Florence store.

Her father Paolo was chief designer of Gucci. He is credited with developing Gucci's "double G" logo. She described her early years as being shaped by the Gucci brand, which inspired her creative pursuits.

After finishing high school, she studied classical archaeology at the University of Siena.

== Career ==
Gucci began her career in the early 1980s as the international public relations representative for the Gucci family business. In this role, she opened 13 Gucci shops globally, also worked as a designer, and organized conferences. She left the company in 1994 after 12 years.

During the early 2000s, she began to dedicate herself to painting and had her first exhibition in Bahrain, her second in Florence at Palazzo Antinori, then in Vienna 2004, Budapest 2009, followed by other exhibitions. She describes her style as “blending abstraction with reality, creating serene depictions of Tuscany landscapes".

Gucci has written several books, including Il piccolo libro della Semplicità, Single: Il fascino della donna libera, Charme, and Gucci: La vera storia di una dinastia di successo. The latter recounts the Gucci company's story, from her own perspective, and has been translated into multiple languages. She has also worked as a journalist for Donna Moderna.

In 2019, she received an art award in memory of the Italian judges Paolo Borsellino and Giovanni Falcone, for her interpretation of The Knotted Gun.

She has featured on Serena Bortone's talk show at Rai 1.

== House of Gucci conflict ==
Patrizia Gucci has been vocal in her criticism of the movie House of Gucci, released in 2021, depicting her family history and the murder of Maurizio Gucci, her father's cousin. She accused the director Ridley Scott of exploiting a family tragedy. Many years before its realization, Patrizia and other members of the family had met Scott over dinner to talk about the movie project. She told the news agency AP ahead of the film release:

“We are truly disappointed. I speak on behalf of the family. They are stealing the identity of a family to make a profit, to increase the income of the Hollywood system... Our family has an identity, privacy. We can talk about everything, but there is a borderline that cannot be crossed.”

== Personal life ==
Gucci resides in Poggio Imperiale, near her native Florence. She remains an active member and ambassador of the Foundation Non-Violence Art Project.
