= Guccio =

Guccio is an Italian given name and surname. People with those names include:

== Given name ==
Guccio or Gucio are diminutives of the Italian medieval given name "Uguccio" (Ugo or Hugh)

- Guccio di Mannaia, 13th-century Italian goldsmith
- Guccio de Medici, 14th-century member of the Medici family, see Medici family tree
- Guccio del Sero, 14th-century Italian painter
- Guccio Gucci (1881–1953), founder of the House of Gucci luxury fashion brand

== Surname ==
- Giannino di Guccio, 14th-century man who claimed to be the adult version of the deceased child king John I the Posthumous of France
- Poggio di Guccio, 15th-century Italian soldier
- Mario Guccio (1953–2018), lead vocalist of Belgian rock band Machiavel

== See also ==
- Gucio Czartoryski (1858-1893) beatified Salesian and Polish noble
- AMZ Dzik aka "Gucio", armoured personnel carrier
- Gucci (disambiguation)
