= Gucci (disambiguation) =

Gucci is an Italian luxury fashion brand and fashion house.

Gucci may also refer to:

== People ==
- Gucci (surname)
- Gucci Mane (born 1980), American rapper
- Gucci Westman (born 1971), American makeup artist.
- Reza Ghoochannejhad (born 1987), known as "Gucci", Iranian footballer

== Music ==
- "Gucci" (Bree Runway and Maliibu Miitch song), a 2020 single
- "Gucci" (Timati song), a 2018 single
- "Gucci Gucci", a 2011 single by Kreayshawn
- Gucci Gucci Tour, a 2011 tour concert tour by Kreayshawn

== See also ==
- House of Gucci, an American 2021 drama film about Patrizia Reggiani and Maurizio Gucci
- Guccio, a given name and surname
- Guci, a type of Chinese drum song
- Guchi, West Azerbaijan, Iran
- Guchi, Hormozgan, Iran
