= Steven Stolman =

American designer and author

- Born: Boston, Massachusetts, U.S.
- Occupations: Designer and Author
- Spouse: Richard Wilkie (m. 2012)

Steven Stolman is an American designer and author. After working in fashion for more than three decades, Stolman transitioned to the world of interior design by being appointed the president of American textiles house, Scalamandré.

While at Scalamandre he authored his first book, Scalamandré: Haute Decor in 2013.

In 2014, Stolman stepped down from his position at Scalamandré to focus on writing more books while also consulting on matters of marketing, branding and public relations for design-related businesses. Steven Stolman is the creator of The Serial Entertainer and RSVP Home by Steven Stolman brands of products.

He has been a contributor to labels such as Albert Nipon, Lilly Pulitzer, Jack Rogers, Town & Country, House Beautiful, Elle Decor, and Architectural Digest. He is the recipient of the Pauline Trigere Gold Thimble Award, is a member of the Council of Fashion Designers of America.

== Books ==
- Betty Kuhner: The American Family Portrait.March 26, 2019. Gibbs Smith. ISBN 978-1423651789.
- Heirloom Houses: The Architecture of Wade Weissmann. Gibbs Smith. August 14, 2018. ISBN 9781423649618.
- The Serial Entertainer's Passion for Parties (First ed.). Gibbs Smit. September 6, 2016. ISBN 9781423642121
- Confessions of a Serial Entertainer. Gibbs Smith. March 9, 2015. ISBN 978-1423637158.
- 40 years of fabulous : the Kips Bay Decorator Show House. Gibbs Smith. May 1, 2014. ISBN 9781423639435.
- Scalamandre: Haute Decor. Gibbs Smith. 2013. ISBN 9781423642121
