= Uguccione (disambiguation) =

Uguccione (also Huguccio or Hugutio) may refer to:

- Huguccio (died 1210), canon lawyer and bishop
- Uguccione da Pisa (fl. c. 1200), grammarian
- Uguccione della Faggiuola (d. 1319), condottiero, ruler of Pisa, Lucca and Forlì
- Uguccione Borromeo (died 1329), bishop of Novara
- Francesco Uguccione (died 1412), archbishop of Bordeaux

== See also ==
- Ugo (given name)
- Gucci (surname)
