= Sabato De Sarno =

Italian fashion designer

- Born: 1983 or 1984 (age 42–43); Cicciano, Italy
- Occupation: Creative Director

Sabato De Sarno (born 1983) is an Italian fashion designer best known for serving as creative director of Gucci from 2023 to 2025, where he was responsible for the house's creative vision across womenswear, menswear, leather goods, accessories, and lifestyle categories.

Before Gucci, De Sarno worked at Prada and Dolce & Gabbana, and spent more than a decade at Valentino, where he rose to the position of Fashion Director overseeing both men's and women's collections.

His appointment to Gucci marked his first time leading the creative direction of a major luxury fashion house, after a long career largely spent in senior behind-the-scenes design roles.

== Early life and education ==
De Sarno was born in 1983 and is from Cicciano, a town near Naples in southern Italy. In interviews, he has described growing up in a small town near Naples and becoming interested in clothing as a form of self-expression, saying that observing what people wore shaped his desire to design clothes. De Sarno studied at Milan's Istituto Secoli (formerly Istituto Carlo Secoli), where he sought technical training in garment construction rather than a purely conceptual fashion education. He has described himself as a technically focused designer, emphasizing pattern-making and the transformation of sketches into finished garments as foundational to his training and approach.

== Career ==
Born in Cicciano, De Sarno started his career with Prada in 2005. He later worked for Dolce & Gabbana and, from 2009, as Director of men's and women's collections at Valentino.

In 2023, De Sarno was appointed Creative Director of Gucci, marking his first role as the creative head of a major fashion house. His debut collection for the Italian luxury brand was presented at Milan Fashion Week in September 2023.

De Sarno's tenure at Gucci concluded on February 6, 2025, when the company announced his departure from the Creative Director position.
