= Corneliani =

Italian menswear manufacturer

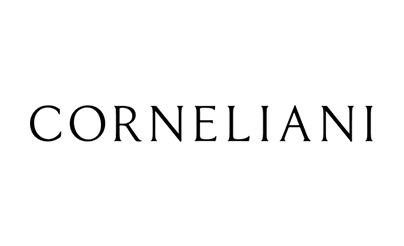
- Industry: Fashion
- Founded: 1930; 96 years ago
- Founder: Alfredo Corneliani
- Headquarters: Mantua, Italy
- Area served: Worldwide
- Products: Men's tailoring, Classic Italian suits
- Services: Fashion production, ready to wear, made to measure
- Parent: Investcorp
- Website: www.corneliani.com

Corneliani is an Italian menswear manufacturer best known for its suits and sportcoats. Corneliani has been 55%-owned by Investcorp since 2016. As of 2026, the brand operates an online store and three shop-in-shops in department stores in the UK. Harrods, Saks Fifth Avenue and Bloomingdale's carry the brand.

== History ==
Originally a family-owned firm, its history stretches back to the 1930s when Alfredo Corneliani set up a small business making raincoats and coats, which was then put on hold during World War II.

Alfredo's sons Claudio and Carlalberto later set up Corneliani S.p.A. in Mantua in 1958. In 1985 the company set up Corneliani USA Inc. in New York to distribute its ranges throughout the US and Canada. In 1997 Corneliani opened its flagship store in Via Montenapoleone, in Milan. In 2005 Corneliani received the Leonardo Prize for Quality, awarded by the President of Italy to Italian companies which promote Italian-made goods. In 2008 Corneliani opened a mono-brand boutique on London’s New Bond Street. In 2012 Corneliani Shanghai Ltd was founded and in 2013 a directly owned flagship store in Shanghai was opened. Today, Corneliani employs 600 tailors, seamstresses and pattern makers in Mantua, which is still where its core products are made.

In 2014, Bill de Blasio gave his inaugural speech as mayor of New York in a Corneliani suit, and the tenor Andrea Bocelli got married in Corneliani suit.

In June 2016, the Bahrain-based investment group Investcorp acquired a 55% stake in Corneliani from the company's family members for $50 million, valuing the company around $100 million. Following this purchase, Carlalberto Corneliani stepped down as CEO of the company. In July 2018, Corneliani opened an online retail store in the United States. In November 2018, Luigi Ferrando replaced Paolo Roviera as CEO of the company. In December 2019, Giorgio Brandazza was appointed CEO of Corneliani.

In January 2021, after the coronavirus pandemic negatively affected the company's sales, the Italian Ministry for Economic Development provided emergency funding to keep the company in operation. In 2021, the Corneliani family still held 20% of the company. The Corneliani family is no longer involved in the company.
