= Paola Franchi =

Italian interior designer (born 1953)

- Born: 17 November 1953 (age 72); Milan, Lombardy, Italy
- Education: Brera Fine Arts Academy
- Occupation: Interior designer
- Spouse: Giorgio Colombo (m. 1983; div. 1991)
- Partner: Maurizio Gucci (1990–1995; his death)
- Children: 1
- Website: www.paolafranchi.it

Paola Franchi (born 17 November 1953) is an Italian interior designer, artist, author and former model. Her 2010 autobiography L'amore spezzato (The Broken Love) details her relationship with Italian businessman Maurizio Gucci, who was murdered in 1995 while they were a couple.

== Early life and relationship with Maurizio Gucci ==
Franchi was born in Milan on 17 November 1953. She attended Accademia di Belle Arti di Brera. Franchi was a childhood friend of Italian businessman Maurizio Gucci and attended his wedding to Patrizia Reggiani in 1972. In 1983, Franchi married copper industrialist Giorgio Colombo. Their son, Charly, was born in 1985.

In 1990, Franchi began dating Gucci after encountering each other at a private club in Saint Moritz. Both reeling from unhappy marriages, Franchi became Gucci's live-in partner for five years, sharing a luxury apartment in Corso Venezia, Milan. When Gucci's divorce from Reggiani was finalized in 1994, Franchi claims that they began plans to get married on Gucci's St. Moritz estate in Switzerland. However, Maurizio's daughter, Allegra Gucci, disputes Franchi's claim, and maintains that her father never intended to marry Franchi. Relatedly, Maurizio Gucci's previous ex-girlfriend, Sheree McLaughlin Loud (whom he dated from 1984 to 1990) claimed that she and Gucci broke off their relationship because Gucci refused to marry her.

In 1995, Maurizio Gucci was gunned down by a hired hitman. The day after the murder, Franchi received an eviction order from Reggiani to move out of the luxury apartment she shared with Gucci. The order was written less than three hours after Maurizio's death. When Franchi moved out, Reggiani moved in with her two daughters, Alessandra and Allegra. The three lived there for two years, until Reggiani's arrest in 1997. In 1998, Patrizia Reggiani was sentenced to 29 years in prison for arranging the killing. According to prosecutors, Reggiani was jealous of Franchi and wanted to prevent her from marrying Gucci. The marriage would have cut Reggiani's alimony in half.

== Personal life ==
On 18 December 2000, Franchi's 16-year-old son Charly Colombo took his own life. Franchi is heavily involved in the charity L'Amico Charly, which was set up in memory of her son to help troubled or suicidal teens.

In 2016, she denied claims she dated Gucci because of his fortune: "Actually my previous husband, whom I left for Maurizio, was even richer, so it was all nonsense."

== In popular culture ==
In the film House of Gucci (2021), Franchi is played by French actress Camille Cottin.

== Bibliography ==
- L'amore spezzato. Rizzoli Publisher. 2010. ISBN 9788817043113. (autobiography)
