= Paolo Gucci =

Italian businessman and fashion designer (1931–1995)

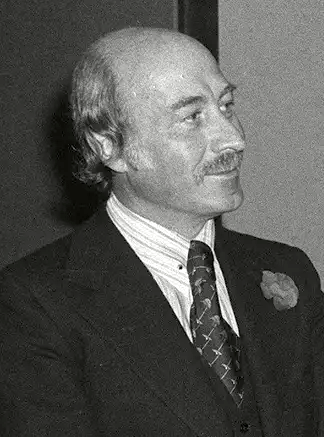
- Gucci in 1977
- Born: 29 March 1931; Florence, Tuscany, Kingdom of Italy
- Died: 10 October 1995 (aged 64); London, England, United Kingdom
- Occupations: Businessman and fashion designer
- Spouses: Yvonne Moschetto (m. 1952); Jenny Puddefoot (m. 1977; sep. 1990)
- Partner: Penny Armstrong (1990–1995)
- Children: 5, including Patrizia
- Father: Aldo Gucci
- Relatives: Patricia Gucci (half-sister); Guccio Gucci (grandfather); Rodolfo Gucci (uncle); Maurizio Gucci (cousin); Alexandra Gucci Zarini (half-niece)

Paolo Gucci (29 March 1931 – 10 October 1995) was an Italian businessman and fashion designer. He was the one-time chief designer and vice-president of Gucci. He is credited with helping design Gucci's double G logo.

== Early life and career ==
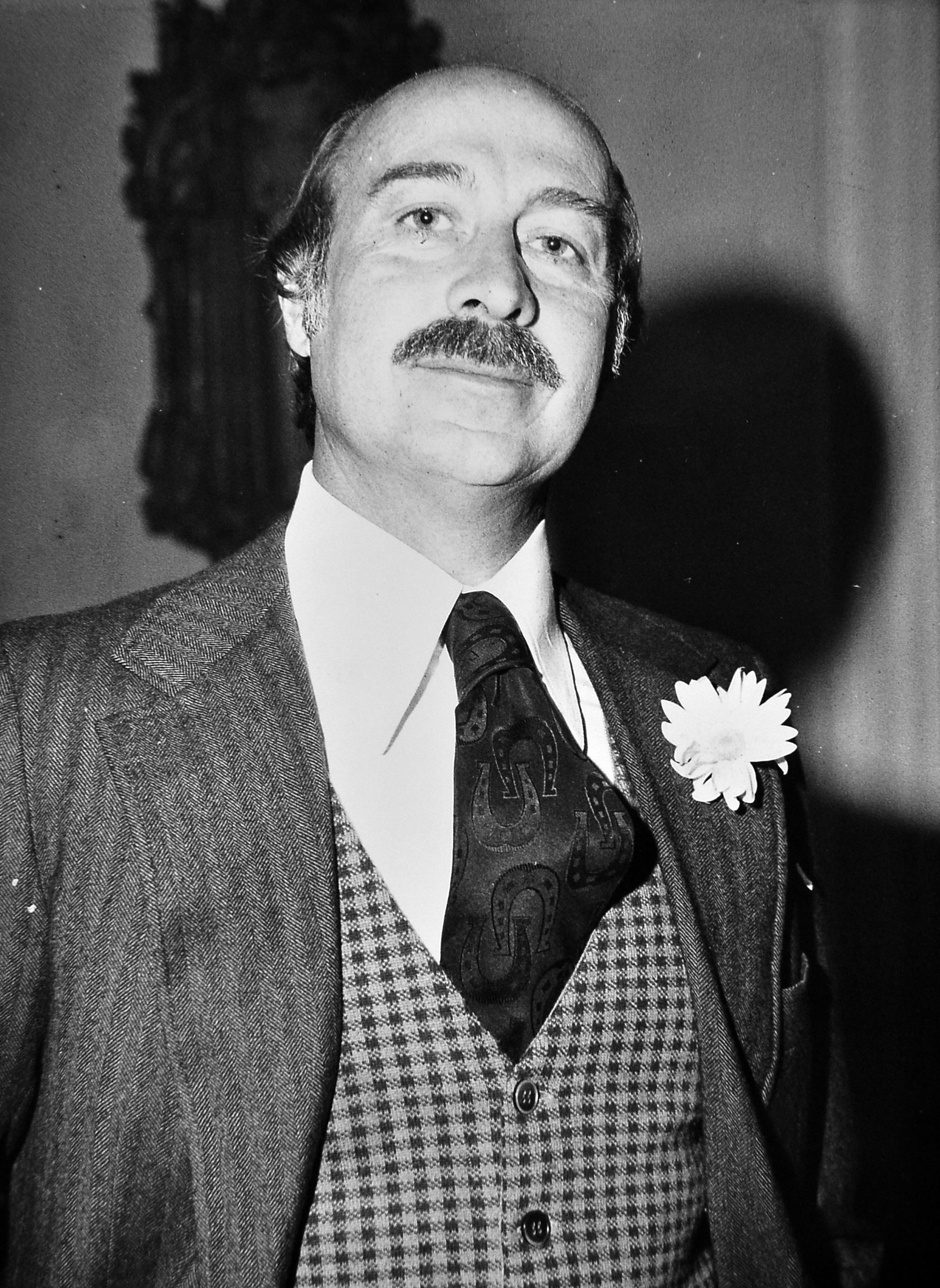
Gucci c. 1970

Paolo Gucci was born on 29 March 1931 in Florence, the son of Olwen Price and Aldo Gucci, who was the son of Gucci founder Guccio Gucci. He was the chief designer of Gucci in the late 1960s. In 1978, his father named him the vice-president of Gucci.

In 1980, Paolo secretly launched his own business using the Gucci name without telling his father, nor his uncle Rodolfo. When they found out, they were both infuriated and fired him from Gucci in September 1980. In addition, his father Aldo sued him, threatening to cut off any Gucci supplier who signed on with Paolo.

In 1984, seeking revenge, Paolo got his father Aldo removed from the company with the help of his cousin Maurizio Gucci, who had recently become the majority shareholder. In addition, Paolo also tipped off the IRS about his father's tax evasion. In 1986, Aldo was sentenced to one year and one day in prison for tax evasion. In 1987, Paolo sold all his shares in Gucci to Investcorp for $42.5 million. Due to divorce proceedings and bad business advice, he filed for bankruptcy in 1993.

== Personal life ==
In 1952, Paolo Gucci married Yvonne Moschetto, with whom he had two daughters, Elisabetta and Patrizia. Although Paolo later obtained a unilateral Haitian divorce from Yvonne, this was not recognized by Italian courts. In 1977, assuming his divorce was valid, he entered into a second marriage with British opera singer Jenny Puddefoot, with whom he had a daughter, Gemma. In 1990, Paolo separated from Puddefoot following an affair with Penny Armstrong, with whom he had two children, Alyssa and Gabriele, out of wedlock.

In 1994, Paolo was incarcerated for five weeks due to unpaid alimony and child support to Puddefoot. Court-imposed restrictions on his ability to use his name in design limited his income. Paolo ultimately appeared voluntarily in New York court, where he was taken into custody and held at the Bronx County House of Detention, where he was described as a well-behaved inmate.

During this time, Paolo Gucci pursued bankruptcy in New York, reportedly on the advice of an associate, resulting in significant depletion of his estate. Gucci America eventually acquired Paolo's design rights, later preventing Puddefoot and her daughter from licensing products under the Gucci name. Paolo Gucci died in London on 10 October 1995, at age 64, due to chronic hepatitis, amid ongoing New York divorce proceedings.

== Arms ==
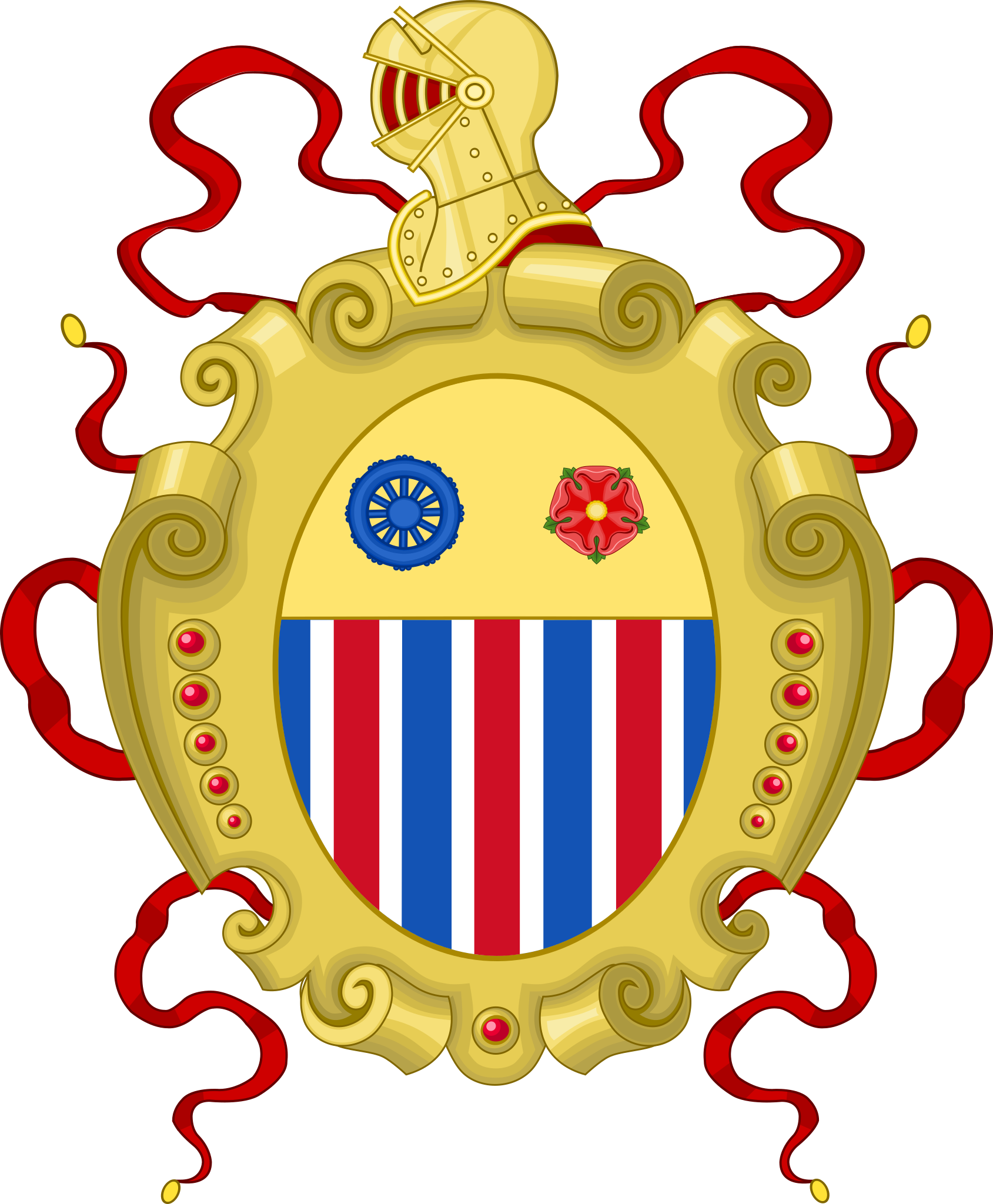
The Gucci coat-of-arms

Guccio Gucci; his eldest living biological son, Aldo Gucci; Aldo Gucci's sons, Giorgio Gucci, Paolo Gucci, and Roberto Gucci; and grandson Uberto Gucci claimed the right to use an inherited, ancestral coat of arms after the Kingdom of Italy, which was ruled by the House of Savoy, transitioned to the Italian Republic in 1946.

The blazon, as recorded in the Archives of Florence, is as follows: "Blue, three red poles bordered with silver; a head of gold, to the right a blue wheel, and to the left a red rose." ("D'azzurro, a tre pali di rosso bordati d'argento; e al capo d'oro caricato a destra di una ruota d'azzurro, e a sinistra di una rosa di rosso.")

Translation: "Family of San Miniato; Giacinto Gucci and his brothers were admitted to the nobility of San Miniato in 1763 (on that occasion it is declared that the family had come from Cremona in 1224); Giuseppe di Gaetano Gucci, on the other hand, was admitted to the nobility of Fiesole in 1839. Francesco di Benedetto Gucci obtained Florentine citizenship in 1601, for the Golden Lion banner; Giovanni Battista by Giovan Piero Gucci obtained it in 1634, in the Scala banner."

Court documents, records, and subsequent rulings indicate that, because the Gucci family trademarked the coat-of-arms in 1955, the trademark transferred with the sale of the Gucci company by Maurizio Gucci to Investcorp, and subsequent company owners, in 1993. However, Uberto Gucci (born 1960), the son of Roberto Gucci, the nephew of Paolo Gucci, and the grandson of Aldo Gucci, claims that the Gucci family still has the right to use the ancestral Gucci coat-of-arms.

== In popular culture ==
In the film House of Gucci (2021), Paolo Gucci is played by American actor Jared Leto, and the script portrays him as a talentless designer. In April 2021, Paolo's daughter Patrizia Gucci criticized Leto's portrayal (unkempt hair, lilac suit) of her father in the film, stating that she "still feels offended". Jared Leto Won a Golden Raspberry Award (Razzie), at the 42nd Golden Raspberry Awards, for Worst Supporting Actor. Despite this, Leto's performance received praise from film critics and earned him nominations for a Critics' Choice Movie Award and Satellite Award—both for Best Supporting Actor.
