= Aldo Gucci =

Italian businessman and fashion designer (1905–1990)

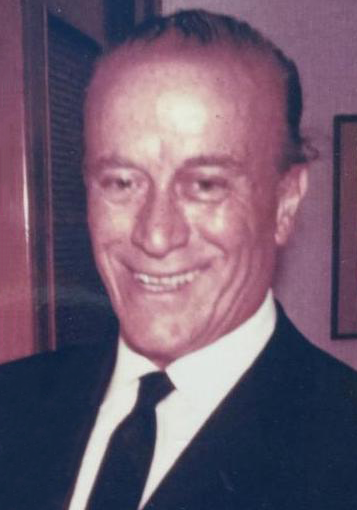
- Gucci in 1964
- Born: 26 May 1905; Florence, Tuscany, Kingdom of Italy
- Died: 19 January 1990 (aged 84); Rome, Lazio, Italy
- Occupations: Businessman; fashion designer
- Known for: Chairman of Gucci (1953–1986)
- Spouses: Olwen Price (m. 1927); Bruna Palombo (m. 1981)
- Children: 4, including Paolo and Patricia
- Father: Guccio Gucci
- Relatives: Rodolfo Gucci (brother); Maurizio Gucci (nephew); Patrizia Gucci (granddaughter); Alexandra Gucci Zarini (granddaughter)

Aldo Gucci (26 May 1905 – 19 January 1990) was an Italian personality and the chairman of Gucci from 1953 to 1986. He was the eldest biological son of Guccio Gucci, who founded the company bearing the family name in 1921.

== Early life and family ==
Aldo Gucci was born on 26 May 1905 in Florence, into a Tuscan family dating back to the thirteenth century in the nearby town of San Miniato. He had three brothers – Vasco, Rodolfo, and Enzo (who died aged nine) – and a sister, Grimalda. He also had a half-brother, Ugo, from his mother's previous relationship. After Enzo had died at nine, Aldo was the eldest of children born to Aida Calvelli and Guccio Gucci.

In his formative years, he developed an interest in equestrianism and botany, which would later find its outlet in product design and a passion for gardening. At age sixteen he began part-time work in his father's first shop in via della Vigna Nuova in Florence. He had a degree in economics from San Marco College in Florence.

== Career ==
From the age of 20, Aldo began work full-time at Gucci. He went on to open the first shop outside of Florence, in Rome in 1938.

Gucci became an overnight status symbol when the bamboo handbag was featured on Ingrid Bergman's arm in Roberto Rossellini's 1954 film Journey to Italy. The GG insignia became an instant favourite of Hollywood celebrities and European royalty.

In 1952, Aldo travelled to New York City with his brothers Rodolfo and Vasco. They opened the first store outside of Italy in New York City, only two weeks before their father's death. President John F. Kennedy heralded Aldo as the first Italian Ambassador to fashion and he was awarded an honorary degree by the City University of New York in recognition of his philanthropic activity, described as the "Michelangelo of Merchandising". He went on to open shops in Chicago, Palm Beach and Beverly Hills, before expanding to Tokyo, Hong Kong and in cities around the world through a global franchising network.

Aldo Gucci was the genius behind the iconic Gucci Bamboo bag, picking up the use of the material in a design he saw in London.

For over thirty years he was dedicated to the expansion of Gucci, developing the company into a vertically integrated business with its own tanneries, manufacturing and retail premises.

=== Later years ===
After their brother Vasco Gucci died in 1974, Rodolfo and Aldo divided the business between themselves 50/50. However, Aldo's sons felt that Rodolfo had not contributed enough to the growth of the business. In an attempt to increase his profits, Aldo set up a perfume subsidiary and held 80 per cent of its ownership for himself and his three sons. This rivalry eventually spiralled into family warfare.

In 1980, Aldo's son Paolo Gucci attempted to launch his own business using the Gucci name, but Aldo disapproved and sued his son, threatening to cut off any Gucci supplier who signed on with Paolo. Seeking revenge, Paolo got Aldo removed from the company in 1984 with the help of his cousin Maurizio Gucci, who had recently become the majority shareholder. In addition, Paolo also tipped off the IRS about his father's tax evasion. In January 1986, Aldo Gucci was sentenced to one year and one day in prison for tax evasion, evading $7 million in New York. He was age 81 at the time of the sentencing. He served his time at the Federal Prison Camp, Eglin.

In 1989, a year before his death, Aldo sold his Gucci shares to Investcorp. That same year, Maurizio was made chairman of the Gucci group following a nearly six-year legal battle for control over Gucci. Maurizio did not have a background in business, and the business was in a dire economic and creative strait by 1993. That year Maurizio Gucci resigned and sold his remaining interest to Investcorp, ending the Gucci family's association with the company.

== Personal life and death ==
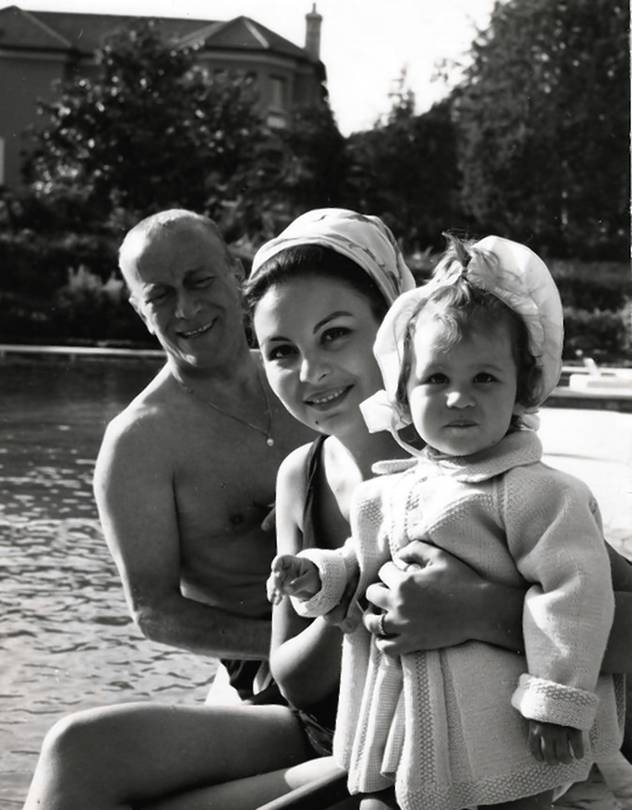
Gucci with Bruna Palombo and their daughter Patricia in Rome, 1965

Aldo married Olwen Price on 22 August 1927, together they had three sons – Giorgio, Paolo and Roberto. He had an extra-marital affair with Bruna Palombo, whom he later married, and they had a daughter Patricia in 1963. Aldo married Bruna in 1981 in America, despite never divorcing Olwen in Italy. He had homes in New York City, Palm Beach, Rome, Florence, Beverly Hills, London, and Paris. Aldo Gucci died in Rome at the age of 84 of prostate cancer, on 19 January 1990. He was buried in the family mausoleum in Florence.

In June 1978, Aldo was appointed a Grand Officer of the Order of Merit of the Italian Republic.

== Arms ==
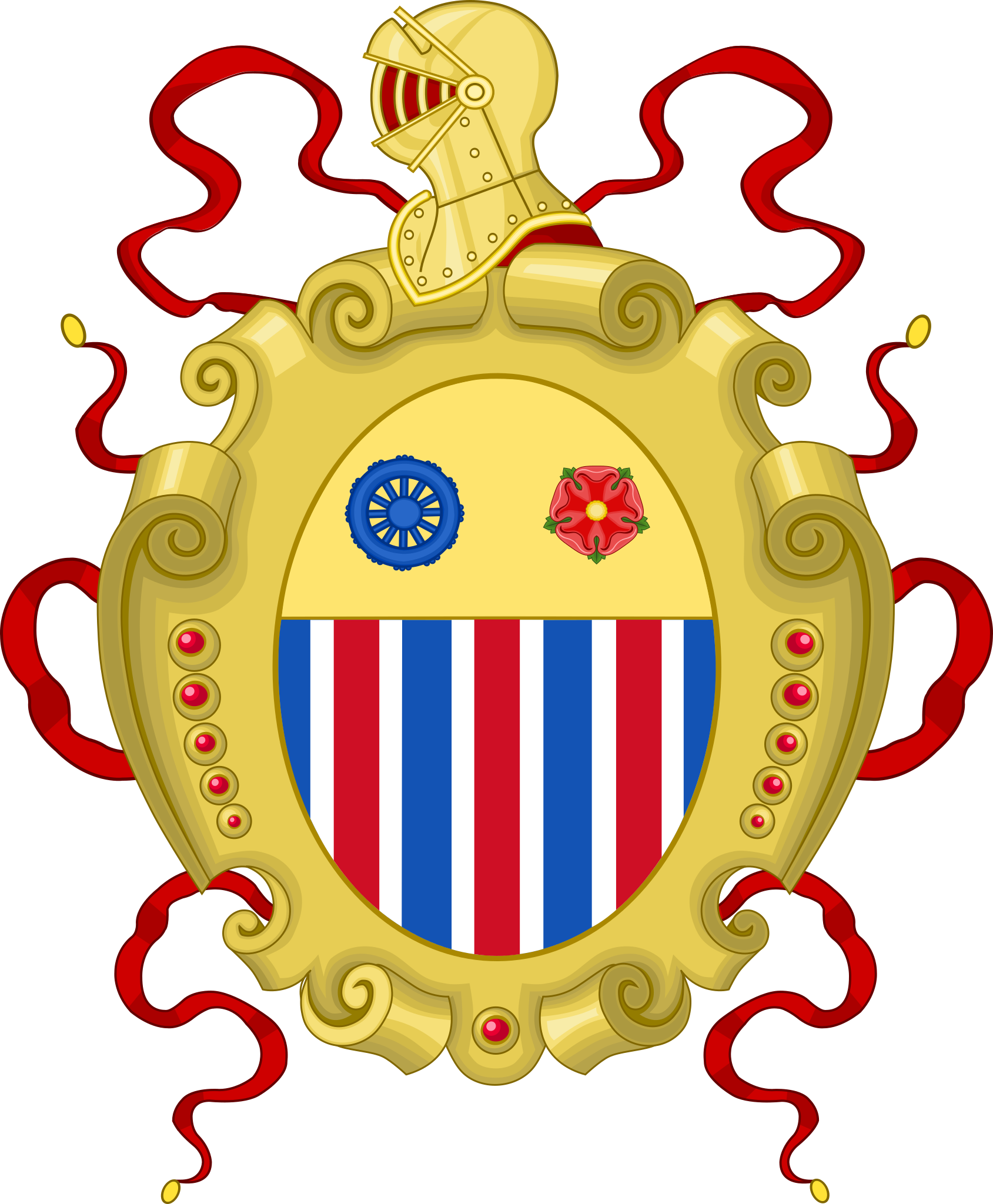
The Gucci coat-of-arms

Guccio Gucci; his eldest living biological son, Aldo Gucci; Aldo Gucci's sons, Giorgio Gucci, Paolo Gucci, and Roberto Gucci; and grandson Uberto Gucci claimed the right to use an inherited, ancestral coat of arms after the Kingdom of Italy, which was ruled by the House of Savoy, transitioned to the Italian Republic in 1946.

The blazon recorded, as recorded in the Archives of Florence, is as follows: "Azure, three red poles bordered argent (white); a chief or, loaded to the right (dexter) of a wheel of azure, and to the left (sinister) of a rose of red." ("D'azzurro, a tre pali di rosso bordati d'argento; e al capo d'oro caricato a destra di una ruota d'azzurro, e a sinistra di una rosa di rosso.")

Translation: "Family of San Miniato; Giacinto Gucci and his brothers were admitted to the nobility of San Miniato in 1763 (on that occasion it is declared that the family had come from Cremona in 1224); Giuseppe di Gaetano Gucci, on the other hand, was admitted to the nobility of Fiesole in 1839. Francesco di Benedetto Gucci obtained Florentine citizenship in 1601, for the Golden Lion banner; Giovanni Battista by Giovan Piero Gucci obtained it in 1634, in the Scala banner."

Court documents, records, and subsequent rulings indicate that, because the Gucci family trademarked the coat-of-arms in 1955, the trademark transferred with the sale of the Gucci company by Maurizio Gucci to Investcorp, and subsequent company owners, in 1993. However, Uberto Gucci (b. 1960), the son of Roberto Gucci, and the grandson of Aldo Gucci, claims that the Gucci family still has the right to use the ancestral Gucci coat-of-arms.

== In popular culture ==
In the film House of Gucci (2021), Aldo Gucci is played by American actor Al Pacino.
