= Patricia Gucci =

Italian fashion designer and executive (born 1963)

- Born: 1 March 1963 (age 63); London, England
- Education: Aiglon College
- Occupations: Founder and creative director of Aviteur
- Spouse: Joseph Ruffalo (div. 2007)
- Children: 3, including Alexandra Gucci Zarini
- Father: Aldo Gucci
- Relatives: Guccio Gucci (grandfather); Paolo Gucci (half-brother); Rodolfo Gucci (uncle); Maurizio Gucci (cousin); Patrizia Gucci (half-niece)
- Website: patriciagucci.com

Patricia Gucci (born 1 March 1963) is an Italian designer and member of the Gucci family. She is the only daughter of Aldo Gucci and granddaughter of Guccio Gucci who founded the company in 1921.

== Early life ==
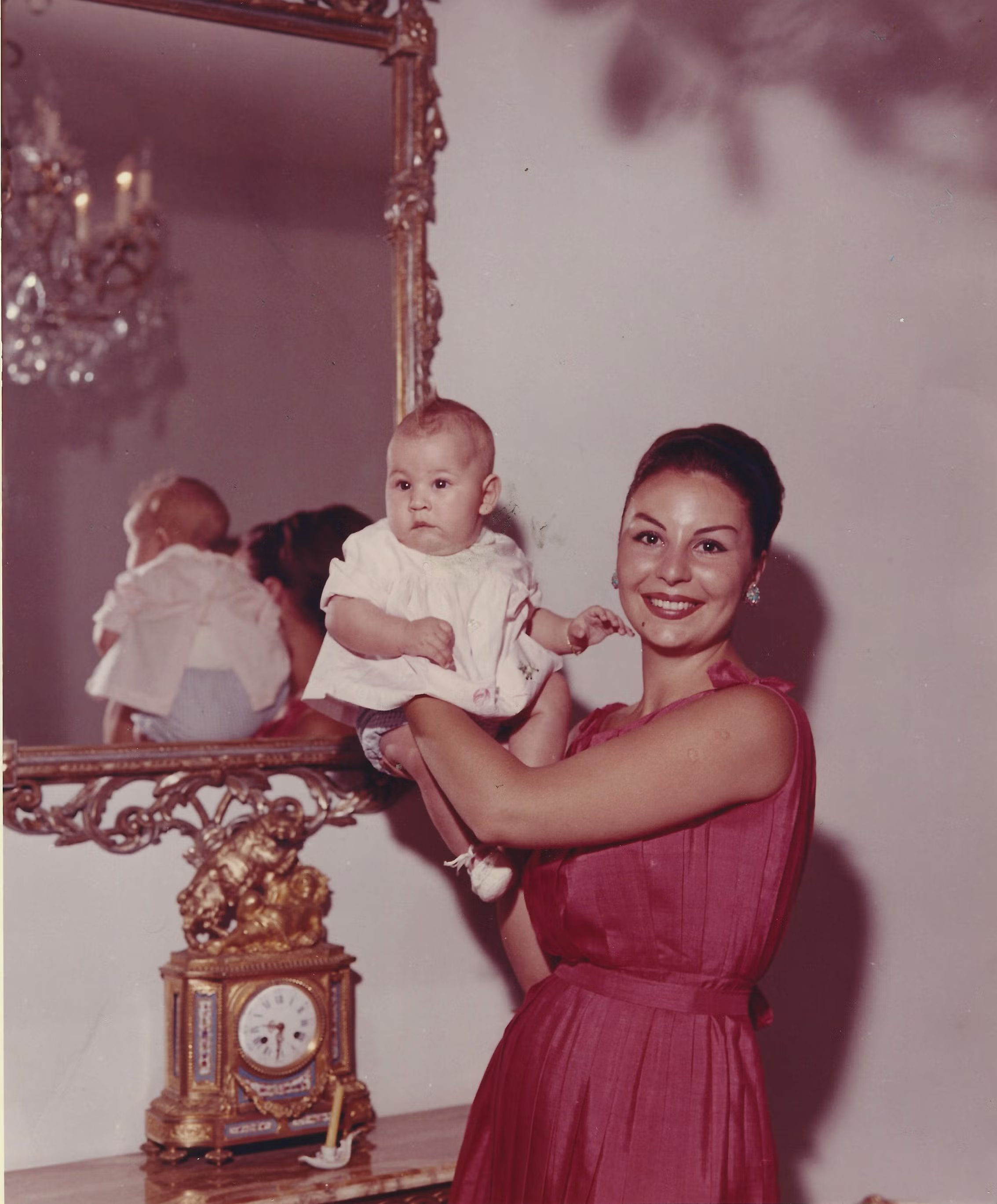
Gucci as infant with her mother Bruna Palombo

She is the daughter of Aldo Gucci, the patriarch of the Gucci fashion empire, and Bruna Palombo; the two met when Bruna was working at the Gucci flagship store in Rome. He was still married to the mother of his three sons, and adultery was illegal in Italy, so they lived in England. They married when Patricia was twenty-four years old and stayed together until his death in 1990.

In 2016, Patricia published a memoir, In the Name of Gucci, in which she revealed that she did not learn that her father had another family and wife until she was ten years old.

== Career ==
Patricia worked at Gucci America as Fashion Coordinator and Brand Ambassador in the US and Asia. In 1983, she became the first woman to be appointed to Gucci's Board of Directors. Her elder half-brother Paolo Gucci broke away from the family firm and tried to set up a rival company. In Aldo's last years, he was involved in a tax scandal and his sons, together with his nephew Maurizio, squeezed control of Gucci away from him. Aldo, in turn, made Patricia his sole heir. The Gucci family business was fully sold in 1993 by Patricia's cousin Maurizio.

In 2018, Patricia Gucci founded the luggage and travel accessories brand Aviteur, of which she is creative director.

== Personal life ==
Gucci has three daughters, Alexandra, Victoria and Isabella.

She was married to Joseph Ruffalo, a music executive who worked with Prince and Earth, Wind & Fire. Gucci divorced Ruffalo in 2007, upon learning that he had sexually abused her daughters Alexandra and Victoria since the early 1990s. In 2020, Patricia Gucci was named in a lawsuit brought forward by her daughter Alexandra for the childhood abuse by her stepfather. In 2025 she was dropped from the lawsuit and Alexandra's stepfather was found liable.
