= Alexandra Gucci Zarini =

Children's rights activist (born 1985)

- Born: Alexandra Gucci; 1985 (age 40–41); New York City, U.S.
- Citizenship: Italy; United States
- Occupations: Founder and Chairman of AGCF; Designer; Children's Advocate
- Spouse: Josef Zarini
- Mother: Patricia Gucci
- Relatives: Aldo Gucci (grandfather); Guccio Gucci (great-grandfather); Paolo Gucci (half-uncle); Rodolfo Gucci (great-uncle); Maurizio Gucci (first cousin once removed); Patrizia Gucci (half-cousin)

Alexandra Gucci Zarini (née Gucci; born 1985) is the founder of the purpose-driven luxury fashion house AGCF, a children's advocate and founder of the Alexandra Gucci Children's Foundation. She is the granddaughter of Aldo Gucci, and great-granddaughter of Guccio Gucci, and a member and heiress of the Gucci family.

== Ventures ==
=== AGCF ===
In 2023, Alexandra Gucci founded AGCF (AG Creative Framework), a purpose-driven luxury fashion house which officially launched in April 2024. With the launch of AGCF, Alexandra Gucci opened a flagship store on Rodeo Drive in Beverly Hills, a location that pays homage to the enduring influence of her grandfather Aldo Gucci, who was one of the early pioneers to open a store for a luxury fashion house on the street. His visionary initiative helped pave the way for Rodeo Drive to become the iconic landmark that it is today.

Following numerous ethical breaches that Alexandra Gucci called the luxury industry out on, from the 2022 Balenciaga advertising scandal that sexualized children, Gucci's 2022 HAHAHA campaign featuring Harry Styles posing in a Teddy Bear T-shirt next to a toddler's mattress, to recent accusations of labor exploitation throughout the luxury supply chain, FORBES called Alexandra Gucci a "Change Agent" of the luxury industry for her visionary approach. Whereas her grandfather helped create the foundation for the luxury industry in the 20th century, Alexandra is envisioning a luxury business model for the 21st century, one that goes beyond creating beautiful, high-quality products available to the few for the benefit of large corporations and their shareholders, to a model founded on responsible, humanistic capitalist principles.

Beyond being a change agent of the industry her grandfather once built, Alexandra Gucci wants to use AGCF as a platform for raising awareness about child abuse. AGCF was founded as a Benefit Corporation, and it donates 20% of its profits to support grassroots charitable organizations that are committed to advocating for children. She believes a fashion brand is a particularly good vehicle for telling this story, because it's also part of an industry that exploits children.

=== Alexandra Gucci Children's Foundation ===
Alexandra Gucci Zarini is the founder and board chair of the Alexandra Gucci Children's Foundation and an advocate for the safeguarding of children around the world.

=== Child Protection Advocate of the Year Award ===
Alexandra Gucci Zarini was honored as the Child Protection Advocate of the Year at the World Childhood Foundation USA's annual gala held on November 6, 2025, in New York City. The event, which raised $1.3 million to support programs aimed at ending child sexual abuse and exploitation, was overseen by HRH Princess Madeleine of Sweden and featured the Young People’s Chorus of New York City. Founded by Her Majesty Queen Silvia of Sweden over 25 years ago, the foundation focuses on prevention and protection efforts nationwide. Gucci Zarini was recognized for her courage as a survivor, her leadership as Founder and Chairman of the Alexandra Gucci Children’s Foundation (established in 2020), and her work with AGCF, a purpose-driven luxury brand that donates 20% of profits to child advocacy organizations. In an exclusive interview, Princess Madeleine highlighted the award's significance, noting Gucci Zarini's role in giving voice to survivors and inspiring systemic change globally.

=== White House Visit ===
On November 13, 2025, Alexandra Gucci Zarini attended the signing of the Fostering the Future Executive Order by President Donald J. Trump and First Lady Melania Trump at the White House, where she met and supported the First Lady's efforts in advancing initiatives for foster care children. The order aims to bolster education and employment pathways for youth aging out of foster care, addressing statistics like only 50% of foster children completing high school and 3% earning a college degree. Gucci Zarini described the event as the "greatest honor" and praised Melania Trump's dedication to children's well-being, emphasizing the vulnerability of foster youth.

=== Launch of the Unity Bag for First Lady Melania Trump's Fostering The Future Initiative ===
On December 5, 2025 Alexandra Gucci Zarini and AGCF launched the Unity Bag as a limited-edition handbag designed in collaboration with and in support of First Lady Melania Trump's Fostering the Future initiative. Priced at $2,800, the artisan-crafted leather bag features a gold oval plaque engraved with a unique edition number, symbolizing hope, unity, and a shared vision to protect and uplift children. Twenty percent of proceeds from sales benefit Fostering the Future by funding scholarships and educational opportunities for foster youth. The 2025 first edition sold out within one week, leading to pre-orders for the 2026 edition available starting December 15, 2025, with delivery in April. Gucci Zarini described it as the "purest expression" of AGCF's mission to blend luxury with impact, inspired by her Grandfather, Aldo Gucci's legacy while addressing ethical issues in fashion and advancing her societal mission to protect and empower children.

== Child abuse lawsuit against her stepfather and family ==
In September 2020, she had filed a lawsuit accusing her stepfather Joseph Ruffalo of sexually assaulting her over a period of 16 years from the age of 6 to the age of 22. She further claimed that her mother, Patricia Gucci, and her grandmother, Bruna Palombo, knew of the abuse and that both women threatened to disinherit her if she was not to remain quiet about it. Alexandra claimed that she believes Ruffalo blackmailed her mother Patricia and that her mothers fear of facing the same fate as her grandfather Aldo Gucci (going to prison for tax evasion) may have guided Patricia Gucci's decision to stay quiet.

In addition to the civil lawsuit against Patricia Gucci, Joseph Ruffalo and Bruna Palombo, Alexandra filed complaints with the Beverly Hills Police Department, the Riverside County Sheriff's Department in California, the Thames Valley Police in England and the Federal Bureau of Investigation. All of these criminal investigations are still ongoing.

In September 2025, in a landmark jury ruling, a Los Angeles jury awarded Alexandra Zarini $115 million in damages after finding her former stepfather, Joseph Ruffalo, liable for sexual abuse and emotional distress. Charges against her mother Patricia Gucci were dropped days before the jury trial. Alexandra Gucci Zarini will be donating any award recovered to non-profit organizations working for the protection of children from child sexual abuse.
