= Mohammed Mahfoodh Al Ardhi =

Omani businessman and military chief (born 1961)

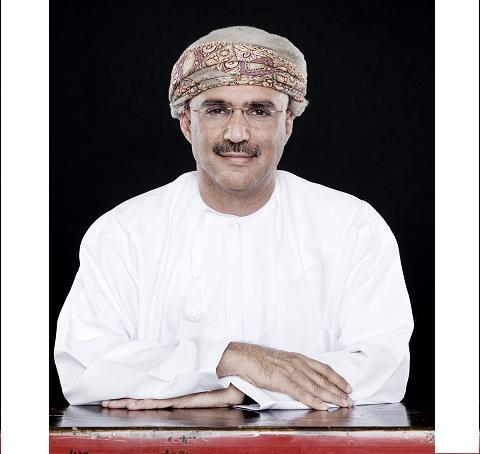
- Born: 1961 (age 64–65); Sur, Oman
- Occupations: Executive Chairman of Investcorp, Chairman of Bank Sohar

Mohammed Mahfoodh Al Ardhi (born May 1961) is an Omani businessman and former military chief. He is currently the Executive Chairman of Investcorp, Chairman of Bank Sohar, Previous Chairman of the National Bank of Oman and was both the youngest and longest serving native head of the Royal Air Force of Oman, having joined as a fighter pilot.

== Family background and early life ==
Al Ardhi was born in Sur, Oman, to Omani parents. His father was head of the regional customs office. Due to the demands of his father's career, Al Ardhi's family moved several times during his early life to various parts of western Oman. Eventually the family moved to Al Batana and finally to Muscat, where Al Ardhi attended secondary school.

Al Ardhi's childhood was often difficult, not just for his family but for Oman as a whole. Families often lived without running water and electricity during this period. The Dhofar Rebellion, a conflict that eventually turned out to be the longest armed conflict in the history of the Arabian Peninsula (1965–1975), Britain's last colonial war in the region, and a proxy war in the Cold War, further exacerbated Oman's problems. It wasn't uncommon for civilians to become victims of the political and military conflict. Al Ardhi's family was no exception. In 1968 and 1969, their homes in Alaswad were bombed by revolutionaries. Government facilities, including his father's office, were often attacked. His father narrowly escaped death during a bombing when he stepped away from his desk.

Shaped by the experience of his country and his family, Al Ardhi was drawn into public service as a young adult. His father played a crucial role during this phase, encouraging his son to take up internships with the government rather than attend summer camps, play sports, or travel. Al Ardhi worked briefly as an intern in the Ministry of Oil and Gas and the court of the Sultan of Oman before he joined the Royal Air Force of Oman at the age of 17.

== Career and education ==
=== Military service ===
A fighter pilot in the early part of his career, he went on to graduate from the United Kingdom's Royal Air Force Military Academy in Cranwell with a Bachelor of Science in Military Science. He also attended the Command and Staff College in Bracknell and the National Defense University in Washington, D.C.

Al Ardhi's service with the Royal Air Force included serving as chairman of the Oman–U.S. Military Commission and chairman of the Oman–Iran Military Committee. He was appointed head of the Omani Air Force, a position he held for 10 years. While head of the air force, Al Ardhi worked hard to standardize military procurement among Persian Gulf countries. Al Ardhi retired from the Royal Air Force with the rank of Air Vice Marshal.

=== Kennedy School at Harvard ===
Following his military service, Al Ardhi earned a Master of Public Administration from the John F. Kennedy School of Government at Harvard University. After graduation, he returned to Oman to join his family's business.

=== Banking ===
In December 2017, Al Ardhi was appointed Chairman of Sohar International, a leading financial institution in Oman.

He was presented with the “Lifetime Achievement Award” in recognition of his outstanding leadership across the organization and contribution to the financial services sector at the Alam-Al Iktissad Wal-Amaal (AIWA) Awards in 2019.

Prior to his role with Sohar International, Al Ardhi served as Vice Chairman and then Chairman of National Bank of Oman (NBO), one of the country's largest financial institutions. He was also the Chairman of the Executive, Nomination and Remuneration Committee (ENRC). As part of his role, Al Ardhi oversaw the bank's growth strategy and its corporate social responsibility programmes, especially those focusing on youth. Under Al Ardhi's leadership NBO has expanded into Islamic banking. NBO has sponsored a conference on Islamic banking and implemented related training for its staff.

=== Energy, real estate, tourism, and other investments ===
Previously, Mohammed Mahfoodh Al Ardhi served as the chairman of Rimal Investment Projects, which has mandate from the government to direct invest in real estate development, oil and gas industry, and information technology.

Al Ardhi also chaired Sundus Investments, which as of 2013 is spearheading the first Rotana hotel in Muscat, as well as other developments to support the country's ambitious tourism objectives as outlined in the Sultanate of Oman's plan for its economy, Vision 2020. As of May 2013, Sundus has invested $60 million in hotels so far and plans four more hotels in Oman including an "eco hotel" on Jebel Akhdar in the Al Jahar Mountains, a resort in Dhofar, and another resort in Sohar. Speaking of his firm's investments in the hotel industry Al Ardhi said, "It ́s pretty much untapped. That ́s why we ́re investing in hotels in Oman. Oman is a fantastic country for tourism; the geography, the people, the topography, We have all the ingredients that make it a hot destination. It is untapped still. It is stable. And the growth is fantastic. That is why we are investing in this."

Al Ardhi was also chairman of Al Ardhi Energy Services, offering support services to oil and gas industry in the GCC region.

He is the Executive Chairman of Investcorp, a leading international provider of alternative investments with a special focus on the Persian Gulf with approximately US$23 billion of assets under management.

Three months after taking up his role as Executive Chairman of Investcorp, Al Ardhi announced a new growth strategy aiming to more than double its US$10.8 billion Assets Under Management (AUM) over the medium term. A number of initiatives were communicated in relation to this plan, namely tapping into European Real Estate markets, establishing a global distribution platform and inorganic growth.

During the first year of his chairmanship, Investcorp strengthened its institutional shareholders base by agreeing to sell a 20% of interest in the company to Mubadala Development Company, the Abu Dhabi-based investment and development company.

=== Non-profit work ===
Al Ardhi serves on the International Advisory Board of The Brookings Institution in Washington, D.C. and is a trustee for the Eisenhower Fellowship in Philadelphia.

== Distinctions ==
- 2000: Order of Oman
- Order of Al Amjad
- Order of Al Istihqaq
- 2012: “Bank of the Year” by The Banker magazine

== Publications ==
- Mahfoodh Al-Ardhi, Mohammed (2008). Arabs Down Under. South Street Press.
- Mahfoodh Al Ardhi, Mohammed (2010). Pearls from Arabia. Berkshire Academic Pr Ltd.
- Mahfoodh Al Ardhi, Mohammed (2019). Arabs Unseen. Bloomsbury Publishing.

== Private life ==
Al Ardhi lives in Muscat, Oman with his wife, three daughters and two sons.
