= Patrizia Reggiani =

Italian socialite and criminal (born 1948)

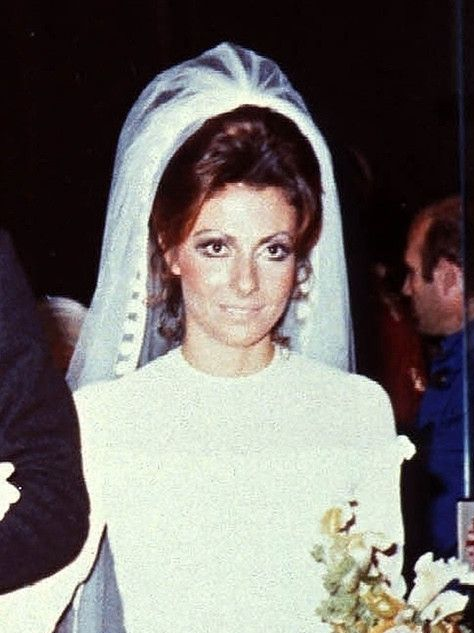
- Reggiani on her wedding day in 1972
- Born: Patrizia Martinelli; 2 December 1948 (age 77); Vignola, Italy
- Other name: Patrizia Gucci
- Known for: Murder of Maurizio Gucci
- Spouse: Maurizio Gucci (m. 1972; div. 1994)
- Children: 2
- Status: Released
- Motive: Resentment
- Conviction: Arranging assassination
- Penalty: 29 years originally, 26 years reduced (served 18 years)

Details
- Victims: Maurizio Gucci
- Date: 27 March 1995
- Locations: San Vittore, Milan, Italy
- Date apprehended: 31 January 1997

Patrizia Reggiani (Italian: [paˈtrittsja redˈdʒaːni]; née Martinelli, born 2 December 1948) is an Italian convicted criminal and former socialite. In a highly publicized trial, she was convicted of hiring a hitman to kill her ex-husband, Maurizio Gucci.

== Early life and marriage to Maurizio Gucci ==
Patrizia Martinelli was born in Vignola, Province of Modena, in Northern Italy. When she was 12, her mother, Silvana Barbieri, married wealthy entrepreneur Ferdinando Reggiani, who later adopted Patrizia.

At a party in 1970, Patrizia met Maurizio Gucci, heir to the Gucci fashion house. On 28 October 1972 the couple married and moved to New York City. Gucci's father, Rodolfo Gucci, initially did not approve of the marriage, believing that Patrizia was "a social climber who had nothing in mind but money," but he gave his son and daughter-in-law a luxury penthouse in New York's Olympic Tower. Patrizia became active in New York social circles, made regular appearances at parties and fashion events, and became friends with Jackie Kennedy Onassis. During her marriage she gave birth to two daughters, Alessandra in 1976 and Allegra in 1981.

In 1982, Patrizia and Maurizio moved back to Milan. In 1985, Gucci told her he was going on a short business trip to Florence. The following day he sent a friend to tell Patrizia that he would not be returning and that the marriage was over. In 1990, Maurizio began dating Paola Franchi, making Patrizia resentful and jealous. She divorced Gucci in 1994 and he agreed to pay her $1.47 million per year in alimony. She was no longer allowed to use the Gucci surname, but continued to do so, stating, "I still feel like a Gucci – in fact, the most Gucci of them all."

== Murder of former husband ==
On 27 March 1995, a year after the divorce, Maurizio Gucci was shot and killed by a hitman on the steps outside his office as he arrived at work. The day he was killed, Patrizia wrote a single word in her diary: "paradeisos", the Greek word for paradise.

On 31 January 1997, Patrizia was arrested and accused of hiring the hitman. The trial garnered intense media interest, with the local press dubbing her the "Black Widow". According to prosecutors, Patrizia's motive was a mixture of jealousy, money, and resentment towards her ex-husband. They argued that she wanted control over the Gucci estate and wanted to prevent her ex-husband from marrying Paola Franchi. The impending marriage would have cut her alimony in half, reducing her annual income to $860,000 a year, which, according to her, amounted to "a bowl of lentils". The hitman, debt-ridden pizzeria owner Benedetto Ceraulo, was found to have been hired by Patrizia through Giuseppina "Pina" Auriemma, a high-society psychic and close friend of Patrizia.

=== Prison time ===
In 1997, Patrizia Reggiani was sentenced to 29 years in prison for arranging the killing. She asked that her conviction be overturned, claiming that a brain tumor had affected her personality. In 2000, an appeals court in Milan upheld the conviction but reduced the sentence to 26 years. In 2000, she tried to commit suicide by hanging herself with a bed sheet, but she was found by prison guards.

In 2005, despite rules against prison pets, Patrizia's legal team convinced the prison to allow her pet ferret to live with her. In October 2011, she became eligible for parole under a work-release programme but refused, saying, "I've never worked in my life, and I'm certainly not going to start now." With credit for good behavior, she was released in October 2016, after 18 years in prison.

== Documentary ==
In 2020, Jovica Nonkovic made the documentary Lady Gucci – La storia di Patrizia Reggiani, where Reggiani tells her perspective of the story.

== In popular culture ==
The film House of Gucci (2021) is based on Patrizia Reggiani's marriage to and murder of Maurizio Gucci. It starred singer and actress Lady Gaga as Reggiani and Adam Driver as Gucci, and was directed by Ridley Scott. The film was announced in November 2019. In March 2021, Reggiani praised the casting of Lady Gaga in the film, saying that she looks like her, but expressed annoyance that Gaga did not meet her before accepting the role. Gaga stated in interviews that she had no interest in "colluding" with Reggiani, but her heart "goes out to her daughters... I do care deeply that this must be very painful for them."
