= Maurizio Gucci =

Italian businessman (1948–1995)

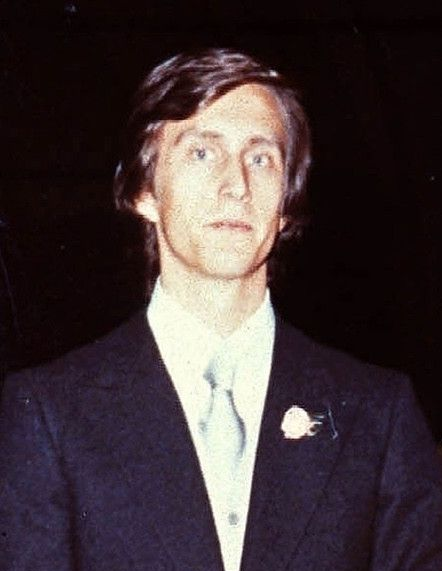
- Gucci on his wedding day in 1972
- Born: 26 September 1948; Florence, Italy
- Died: 27 March 1995 (aged 46); Milan, Italy
- Cause of death: Murder by gunshot
- Resting place: Friedhof Somplaz, St. Moritz, Switzerland
- Occupation: Businessman
- Known for: Member of the Gucci family
- Spouse: Patrizia Reggiani (m. 1972; div. 1994)
- Partner: Paola Franchi (1990–1995)
- Children: 2
- Parents: Rodolfo Gucci (father); Sandra Ravel (mother)
- Relatives: Guccio Gucci (grandfather); Aldo Gucci (uncle); Paolo Gucci (cousin); Patricia Gucci (cousin); Patrizia Gucci (cousin once removed); Alexandra Gucci Zarini (cousin once removed)

Maurizio Gucci (26 September 1948 – 27 March 1995) was an Italian businessman and the one-time head of the Gucci fashion house. He was the son of actor Rodolfo Gucci, and grandson of the company's founder Guccio Gucci. On 27 March 1995, he was shot and killed by a hitman hired by his ex-wife, Patrizia Reggiani.

== Early life and career ==
Maurizio Gucci was born on 26 September 1948 in Florence as the only child of actors Rodolfo Gucci and Sandra Ravel. In 1972, Gucci moved to New York City to work for the Gucci company with his uncle Aldo Gucci. In the early 1980s, he lived in a luxury penthouse in the Olympic Tower, gifted to him by his father. In 1982, he moved back to Milan, and in 1983, launched a legal battle against Aldo for control over Gucci after becoming the majority shareholder following his father's death.

In 1986, Gucci fled to Switzerland to avoid prosecution after Aldo, seeking revenge, had accused him of forging his father's signature to avoid paying inheritance taxes. He was originally found guilty, but was later acquitted. In 1988, 47.8% of Gucci was sold to the Bahrain-based investment fund Investcorp.

Maurizio Gucci was made chairman of the Gucci group in 1989. From 1991 to 1993, Gucci's finances were in the red. Maurizio Gucci was blamed for spending extravagantly on the company's headquarters in Florence and Milan. He went on to sell his remaining company stock in 1993 for $170 million to Investcorp, ending the Gucci family's association with the company.

== Relationships ==
In 1972, Gucci married Patrizia Reggiani, with whom he had two daughters, Alessandra and Allegra. Alessandra Gucci was born on 28 June 1976, and Allegra Gucci was born on 27 January 1981.

Maurizio's father, Rodolfo Gucci, originally did not approve of their marriage, calling Patrizia "a social climber who has nothing in mind but money." On 21 March 1985, Maurizio told his wife he was going on a short business trip to Florence. The following day – 22 March – he sent a friend to tell his wife he would not be returning, and that the marriage was over. The two were considered separated.

From 1984 to 1990, Gucci dated Sheree McLaughlin Loud, an American model from Orange, Connecticut. McLaughlin Loud was 26 (b. 1958) at the time of their first meeting; and Gucci, 35 years old. The two met in the Sardinian town of Porto Cervo during the 12-Metre Class World Championship for the upcoming 1987 America's Cup after McLaughlin Loud had joined Maurizio's sailing crew for the event, coaching and teaching Gucci's other crew members. Both Gucci and McLaughlin Loud were married to other people at the time, and McLaughlin Loud reported seeing Gucci with Reggiani from time to time. McLaughlin Loud claims that Gucci left his wife in 1985 due to having an affair with her; Gucci had pursued McLaughlin Loud relentlessly under the guise of wanting to offer McLaughlin Loud employment, tracking her and her husband to Clearwater, Florida, and calling her every day. McLaughlin Loud divorced her husband in 1988, and Gucci rented her an apartment in New York City. Gucci also paid for McLaughlin Loud to fly on regular Concorde trips between the United States and London or Paris to visit him, where Gucci would then drive her to St. Moritz, Switzerland, in his black Ferrari sports car.

Loud got a job at Sotheby's in 1988, and moved to London, which made it easier for her and Gucci to see each other. Gucci doted on her, but Loud claimed that he did not want her to move to Milan, where he thought the strict social codes — and the Milanese socialites — "would make them both miserable". The same year, Gucci forced out his remaining family members from the fashion company. McLaughlin Loud would continue to meet Gucci in European port cities — Bremen, Monte Carlo, and Palma de Mallorca — to help restore Gucci's prized historic sailing yacht, The Creole. However, the drama between Gucci and his soon-to-be-ex-wife, Reggiani, and the constant travel between the U.S. and Europe started to weigh on McLaughlin Loud in 1989. She told Gucci that she wanted to end their relationship, even though she said she would always be in love with him. McLaughlin Loud also wanted to settle down, start a family, and "live a normal life". She and Gucci ultimately ended their relationship due to this, as Gucci stated that he wanted to focus more on the company and reconciling with his two daughters from his previous marriage, Alessandra and Allegra. McLaughlin Loud would later go on to work for Vogue as a merchandizing editor, where she learned of Gucci's murder via a phone call with Gucci's lawyer, Allan Tuttle, in 1995.

In 1990, Gucci began dating Paola Franchi, a childhood friend who had attended his wedding to Patrizia, after the two encountered each other at a private club in St. Moritz, Switzerland. Both were reeling from unhappy marriages; and, with Franchi and her husband, Giorgio Colombo, on the outs, Franchi became Gucci's partner. Franchi divorced Colombo in 1991. Maurizio Gucci's divorce from Reggiani was finalized in 1994.

In 2022, Maurizio's younger daughter, Allegra Gucci, released her book Game Over (Italian: Fine dei Giochi), which is about the aftermath of her father's murder and the conviction of her mother.

As of 2022, Maurizio has three grandchildren through his daughters, Alessandra and Allegra, who have both married in the time since Maurizio's death. Alessandra Gucci has one son with her husband, and the three have taken up permanent residence in Switzerland. Allegra Gucci married Enrico Barbieri in St. Moritz, Switzerland, in a civil ceremony on 24 November 2011, and then in religious ceremony on 20 December 2011. The couple have two children.

== Death ==
Murder of Maurizio Gucci
- Location: Milan, Italy
- Date: 27 March 1995; 31 years ago
- Target: Maurizio Gucci
- Attack type: Murder, mariticide, assassination, contract killing, proxy murder
- Deaths: 1 (Maurizio Gucci)
- Perpetrators: Benedetto Ceraulo (shooter); Patrizia Reggiani; Pina Auriemma; Ivano Savioni; Orazio Cicala
- Motive: Resentment
- Verdict: Guilty
- Convictions: Ceraulo: Murder; Reggiani, Auriemma, Savioni, Cicala: Arranging assassination
- Sentence: Ceraulo: Life imprisonment; Reggiani: 29 years in prison (reduced to 26 years on appeal, released after 18 years); Cicala: 29 years in prison; Savioni: 26 years in prison; Auriemma: 25 years in prison (reduced to 19 years)

On 27 March 1995, Gucci was shot by a hired hitman on the steps outside his office as he arrived at work. His body was laid to rest in St. Moritz, Switzerland, soon after the killing.

Gucci's former wife Patrizia Reggiani was convicted in 1998 of arranging his murder. According to prosecutors, Reggiani's motives were a mixture of jealousy, money, and resentment towards her former husband. She served 18 years in prison and was released in October 2016.

== In popular culture ==
A film inspired by the story, titled House of Gucci, was directed by Ridley Scott, and features Lady Gaga as Patrizia Reggiani and Adam Driver as Maurizio Gucci. House of Gucci was released in the United States on 24 November 2021, by United Artists Releasing.

The Gucci family issued a statement to the portrayal of the family and the murder. "Although the film claims to tell the 'true story' of the family, the narrative is anything but accurate, depicting Aldo Gucci — president of the company for 30 years — and other members of the Gucci family who were the protagonists of well-documented events, as hooligans, ignorant and insensitive to the world around them."
