= Rodolfo Gucci =

Italian actor and entrepreneur

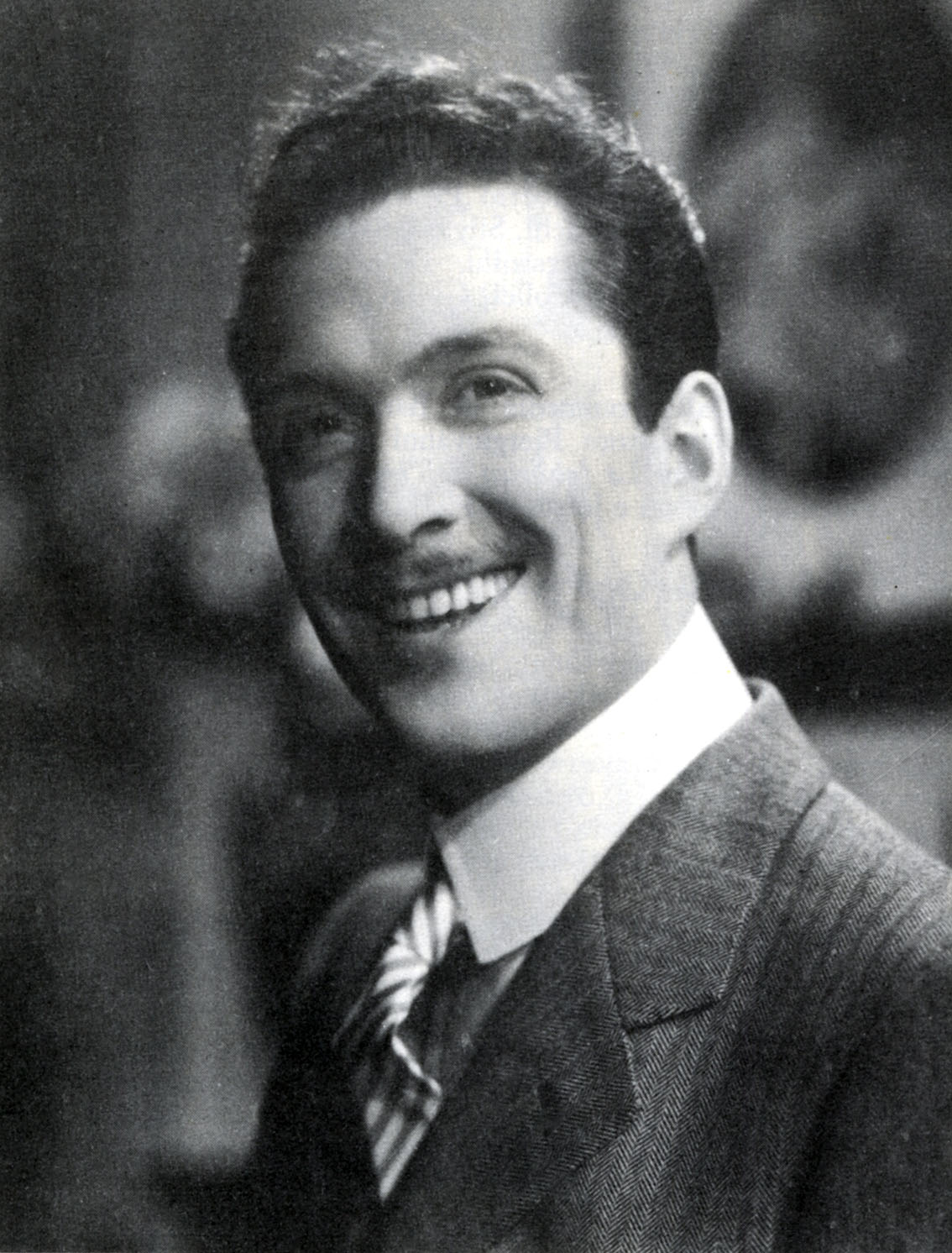
- Gucci in 1940
- Born: Rodolfo Gucci; 16 July 1912; Florence, Tuscany, Kingdom of Italy
- Died: 15 May 1983 (aged 70); Milan, Lombardy, Italy
- Other name: Maurizio D'Ancora
- Occupations: Actor, entrepreneur
- Spouse: Sandra Ravel (m. 1944; died 1954)
- Children: Maurizio Gucci
- Parents: Guccio Gucci (father); Aida Calvelli (mother)
- Relatives: Aldo Gucci (brother); Paolo Gucci (nephew); Patricia Gucci (niece); Alexandra Gucci Zarini (great-niece); Patrizia Gucci (great-niece)

Rodolfo Gucci (16 July 1912 – 15 May 1983), also known by his stage name Maurizio D'Ancora, was an Italian actor and entrepreneur, who appeared in more than 40 films between 1929 and 1946. He was a member of the Gucci family. His only child, Maurizio Gucci, was named after his stage name.

== Biography ==
Rodolfo Gucci was born in 1912 in Florence, Italy to Aida Calvelli and Guccio Gucci. He was one of five sons and one daughter.

He was spotted by the director Alfred Lind who gave him his film debut in 1929. The same year he appeared in Mario Camerini's Rails, which launched his career. He used Maurizio D'Ancora as his screen name. While filming Together in the Dark, he met his future wife. He was married in 1944 in Venice, Italy to the actress Sandra Ravel. Their only child was born in 1948, Maurizio, named after his father's stage name.

=== Member of the Gucci Family ===
He was one of the five sons of Guccio Gucci, founder of the eponymous fashion house. In January 1953, D'Ancora left acting and returned to the family business after the death of his father. In 1952, Rodolfo and his brothers Aldo and Vasco traveled to New York City. They opened the first Gucci store outside of Italy in New York City, only two weeks before their father's death. In 1967, he created the Gucci Flora scarf for Grace Kelly.

After their brother Vasco Gucci died in 1974, Rodolfo and Aldo divided the business among themselves 50/50. However, Aldo's sons felt that Rodolfo had not contributed enough to the growth of the business. In an attempt to increase his profits, Aldo set up a perfume subsidiary and held 80 percent of its ownership for himself and his three sons. This rivalry eventually spiralled into family warfare.

=== Death and legacy ===
Rodolfo Gucci died in 1983 in Milan. After his death, his son Maurizio Gucci inherited his majority stake in the company and became the majority shareholder. After a nearly six-year legal battle for control over Gucci against Aldo Gucci, in 1989 Maurizio Gucci was made chairman of the Gucci group. Maurizio did not have a background in business, and by 1993 the business was in dire economic and creative straits. That year Maurizio Gucci resigned and sold his remaining interest to Investcorp, ending the Gucci family's association with the company. In 1995, Maurizio Gucci was gunned down by a hired hit man. In 1998, his ex-wife Patrizia Reggiani was convicted of arranging the killing.

== In popular culture ==
In the film House of Gucci (2021), Rodolfo Gucci is played by English actor Jeremy Irons.

== Selected filmography ==
Year	Title	Role	Notes
1929	Rails	Giorgio	Originally made as a silent film.
1929	Girls Do Not Joke		
1931	Figaro and His Great Day	Asdrubale Chiodini	
1932	Venus	Il giovane Italo-Americano	
1932	The Old Lady	Fausto	
1932	Five to Nil		
1933	Together in the Dark		
1933	Tourist Train		
1934	The Canal of the Angels		
1935	Those Two		
1935	Golden Arrow		
1935	Territorial Militia		
1935	Ginevra degli Almieri		
1936	The Ambassador		
1936	Beggar's Wedding	Umberto Tappi	
1938	Nonna Felicità		
1938	The Ancestor		
1939	No Man's Land		
1939	Heartbeat	Yves	
1939	The Boarders at Saint-Cyr	Renato Marchand	
1939	The Document	L'ingegnere Pezzini detto 'Pallino'	
1939	The Hotel of the Absent	Il giovanetto galante	
1939	The Night of Tricks	Filippo	
1940	Don Pasquale	Ernesto	Film is loosely based on Giovanni Ruffini's libretto for Gaetano Donizetti's opera buffa Don Pasquale.
1940	One Hundred Thousand Dollars	Paolo	
1942	Alone at Last	Giulio De Ritis	
1943	Annabella's Adventure	Roberto	
1943	Charley's Aunt	Guidobaldo	
1943	Special Correspondents	Galletti	
1946	Biraghin	Paolo	
