= Aghinetti =

Italian painter

Aghinetti, also called Guccio del Sero or Marco di Guccio, was an Italian painter, active in Florence in 1331. He had a nephew, called Maestro Guccio, who died in 1409. He painted in the church of Santa Reparata of Florence in a style that recalls Giotto.
