= Guccio Gucci =

Italian businessman and fashion designer (1881–1953)

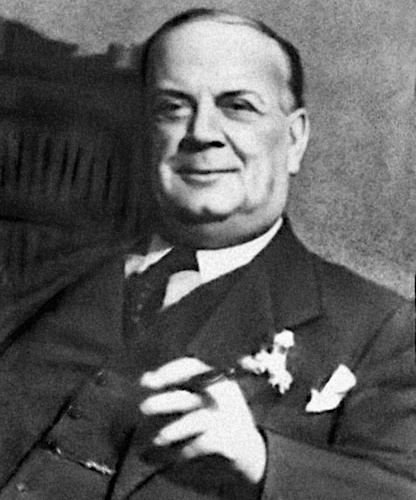
- Gucci, c. 1940
- Born: Guccio Giovanbattista Giacinto Dario Maria Gucci; 26 March 1881; Florence, Tuscany, Kingdom of Italy
- Died: 2 January 1953 (aged 71); Milan, Lombardy, Italy
- Known for: Founder of Gucci
- Spouse: Aida Calvelli
- Children: 6, including Aldo and Rodolfo
- Relatives: Maurizio Gucci (grandson); Paolo Gucci (grandson); Patricia Gucci (granddaughter); Alexandra Gucci Zarini (great-granddaughter); Patrizia Gucci (great-granddaughter)

Guccio Giovanbattista Giacinto Dario Maria Gucci (pronounced [ˈɡuttʃo ˈɡuttʃi]; 26 March 1881 – 2 January 1953) was an Italian businessman and fashion designer and founder of the fashion house Gucci.

== Early life ==
Guccio Gucci was born in Florence, Tuscany, on 26 March 1881. He was the son of Tuscan parents, Gabriello Gucci, a leather craftsman from San Miniato, and Elena Santini, from Lastra a Signa.

As a teenager, in 1899, Guccio Gucci worked at the Savoy Hotel in London.

== Career ==
In 1921, he founded the House of Gucci in Florence on Via della Vigna Nuova as a small family-owned leather shop. He began selling saddles, leather bags and other accessories to horsemen in the 1920s. During the 1930s League of Nations sanctions on Italy, which led to leather shortages, he innovated by developing a specially-woven hemp fabric from Naples. In 1938, Gucci expanded his business to a second location in Rome at the insistence of his son Aldo. His one-man business eventually turned into a family business when his sons joined the company. Aldo, the eldest son who joined in 1925, proved particularly innovative in developing new products, including the company's first pigskin bag.

In 1951, Gucci opened their shop in Milan. He wanted to keep the business small, and for nearly the entirety of his life, the company remained only in Italy. Two weeks before Gucci's death, the New York Gucci boutique was opened by his sons Aldo, Rodolfo, and Vasco.

== Death and legacy ==
Gucci died on 2 January 1953 in Milan. After his death, the business was left to his four remaining sons. With the change in leadership the Gucci brand expanded to opening international locations and a diversification of product line.

The Gucci Museum (also called Gucci Garden) in Florence, is a fashion museum centered around the history of the company and Guccio Gucci.

== Personal life ==
Gucci and his wife, Aida Calvelli, married in 1901 and had six children, five sons and one daughter. His son Ugo Calvelli Gucci (1899–1973) was adopted, born from his mother Aida Calvelli's previous relationship. His son Enzo (1904–1913) died in childhood. His sons Ugo, Aldo, Vasco, and Rodolfo Gucci held prominent roles in his company, but his daughter was not given a role. There was a lot of sibling rivalry to hold power within the company, and by the 1980s, this became a serious issue dividing the family.

In his final years, he lived near Rusper, in West Sussex, England.

== Arms ==
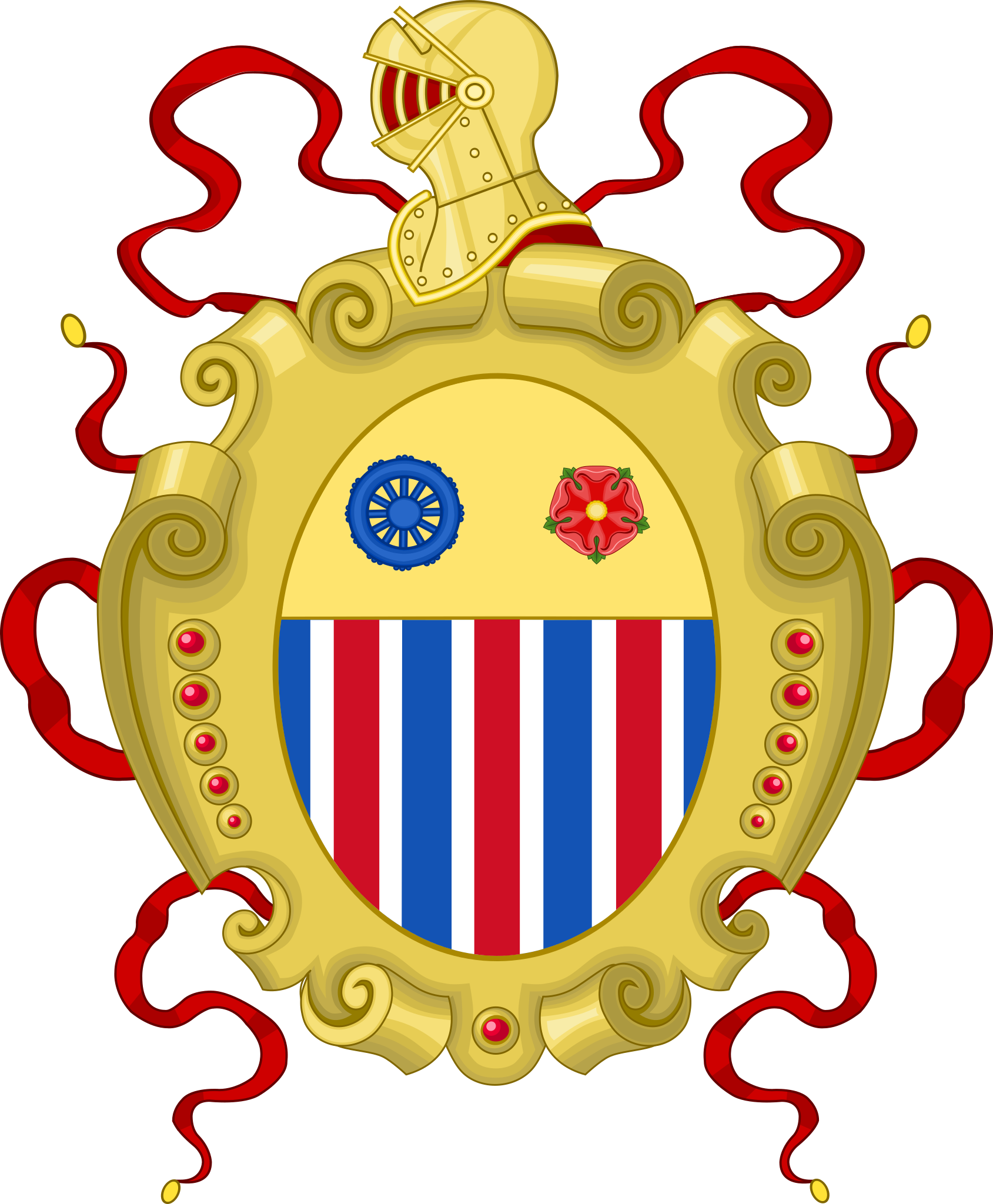
The Gucci coat-of-arms

Guccio Gucci; his eldest biological son, Aldo Gucci; Aldo Gucci's sons, Giorgio Gucci, Paolo Gucci, and Roberto Gucci; and grandson Uberto Gucci claimed the right to use an inherited, ancestral coat of arms after the Kingdom of Italy, which was ruled by the House of Savoy, transitioned to the Italian Republic in 1946.

Guccio Gucci adapted, or incorporated, the Gucci coat-of-arms, as recorded in the Archives of Florence, into the Gucci company's knight logo, which was trademarked by the Gucci company on 4 February 1955.

The blazon recorded in the Florence Archives is as follows: "Azure, three red poles bordered argent (white); a chief or, loaded to the right (dexter) of a wheel of azure, and to the left (sinister) of a rose of red." ("D'azzurro, a tre pali di rosso bordati d'argento; e al capo d'oro caricato a destra di una ruota d'azzurro, e a sinistra di una rosa di rosso.")

Translation: "Family of San Miniato; Giacinto Gucci and his brothers were admitted to the nobility of San Miniato in 1763 (on that occasion it is declared that the family had come from Cremona in 1224); Giuseppe di Gaetano Gucci, on the other hand, was admitted to the nobility of Fiesole in 1839. Francesco di Benedetto Gucci obtained Florentine citizenship in 1601, for the Golden Lion banner; Giovanni Battista by Giovan Piero Gucci obtained it in 1634, in the Scala banner."

Court documents, records, and subsequent rulings indicate that, because the Gucci family trademarked the coat-of-arms in 1955, the trademark transferred with the sale of the Gucci company by Maurizio Gucci to Investcorp, and subsequent company owners, in 1993. However, Uberto Gucci (b. 1960), the son of Roberto Gucci, and the grandson of Aldo Gucci, claims that the Gucci family still has the right to use the ancestral Gucci coat-of-arms.

== See also ==
- Salvatore Ferragamo
- Ermenegildo Zegna (businessman)
- Louis Vuitton (designer)
