= Albert Nipon =

American fashion designer (1927–2022)

- Born: September 11, 1927; West Philadelphia section of Philadelphia, Pennsylvania, U.S.
- Died: November 20, 2022 (aged 95); Philadelphia, Pennsylvania, U.S.
- Occupation: Fashion designer
- Label: Albert Nipon
- Children: Larry, Andy, Leon, Barbara

Albert Nipon (September 11, 1927 – November 20, 2022) was an American fashion designer and ladies clothing manufacturer.

== Early life and education ==
Nipon was born and raised in West Philadelphia, a section of Philadelphia, Pennsylvania on September 11, 1927. He was born to Louis and Sara Nipon, Jewish immigrants who fled the Russian pogroms during World War I. Nipon graduated from West Philadelphia High School.

Nipon, a graduate of Temple University, began his professional life as an accountant for DuPont.

Nipon and his wife, Pearl, reportedly met when he threw her fully clothed into a swimming pool. They had three sons, Laurence, Leon, and Andrew, and a daughter, Barbara Joy, who is known as "B.J.". They lived in a condominium at the Residences at the Ritz-Carlton in Center City Philadelphia.

The Nipons started their foray into fashion in 1954 as designers of maternity clothes. Albert ran the business, while Pearl designed the clothing. They opened a small dress shop, which grew into a chain of stores called Ma Mere.

== Career ==
The Nipons turned their maternity clothes company into an internationally known producer of ultra-feminine women's clothing in 1972. The birth rate was declining, and they decided to focus on creating chic dress. They sold Ma Mere to Dekon Corporation.

Albert Nipon gave all the credit for the line that bears his name to Pearl and her design aesthetic. She, however, says she merely edits the lines.

"Pearl is a chic woman," he told the News and Courier in a 1973 interview. "She has a feel for what young career women would like their clothes to be. Smart, fluid, comfortable, in wonderful fit and the nice detailing that looks like the dress was made to order in Europe."

The line's popularity caught the fashion world by surprise and quickly made Nipon's "Albert Nipon" brand of clothing famous. Sales of Albert Nipon dresses reached US$60 million in 1984, and Nipon counted among his celebrity clients Rosalynn Carter, Mary Tyler Moore, Nancy Reagan, and Barbara Walters.

Nipon's fall was as rapid as his rise; in 1984, he was indicted for tax evasion and bribery in an investigation of the Philadelphia, Pennsylvania, Internal Revenue Service office and served time in a federal penitentiary. He was housed at Eglin Air Force Base in Florida, a minimum security facility.

"When you are stripped of everything material and physical and emotional, I don't care what the surroundings are, I don't know how anyone can call that a country club," he said in a Philadelphia Inquirer interview. "You have a job to do - I sorted clothes or cut grass - but it's just a job, a menial job. The challenge is to keep yourself busy, and I did that.

"When the only thing you have is your mind, I understand now the tendency to become more spiritual," he said. "I was fortunate enough to be selected for a seminar at a rabbinical college. I learned a lot about Judaism, history and the Bible; I don't think I would have been able to do that otherwise."

During the 20 months he was incarcerated, his company reportedly lost $15 million in revenues.

However, the designer's career did not end with his conviction and incarceration. Sales initially rebounded with Nipon himself stating they could not ship clothing sufficiently fast to fill orders.

The company declared bankruptcy in 1988. It was sold in 1988 to the Leslie Fay Company, which allowed the Nipons to continue running the design business. Albert Nipon designs and fragrances continue to be available in dress shops and fashion boutiques around the world. Leslie Fay filed for bankruptcy in April 1993. Albert Nipon went into bankruptcy for a third time when current parent company Nine West Holdings filed for bankruptcy in 2018.

== Death ==
Nipon died on November 20, 2022, at the age of 95.

== See also ==
- List of fashion designers
- List of people from Philadelphia
