= Investcorp =

Bahraini corporation

Investcorp Holdings B.S.C.
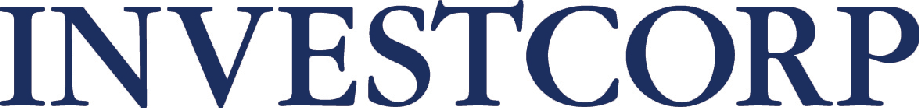
- Type: Private
- Industry: activities of holding companies financial service activities, except insurance and pension funding
- Founded: 1982; 44 years ago
- Founders: Nemir Kirdar, Elias Hallak,Cem Cesmig, Mike Merritt
- Headquarters: Manama, Bahrain
- Key people: Mohammed Mahfoodh Al Alardhi (executive chairman); Rishi Kapoor; Vice Chairman and Chief Investment Officer
- Products: Private equity, Real Assets, Absolute Return Investments, credit management
- AUM: US$62.3 billion
- Website: investcorp.com

Investcorp is a global alternative investment company headquartered in Manama, Bahrain. Founded in 1982, the firm invests across private equity, real assets, credit, infrastructure, insurance asset management, and other alternative investment strategies. As of July 2026, Investcorp reported $62.3B worth of assets under management.

The firm has offices in Bahrain, United States, United Kingdom, Saudi Arabia, Qatar, United Arab Emirates, India, China, Japan, and Singapore. Since 2015, the firm has been chaired by Mohammad Alardhi. Mubadala Investment Company is Investcorp's largest external shareholder.

The firm's client base includes private and institutional investors, with a focus on investors in the Gulf Cooperation Council (GCC) countries, as well as North America, Europe, and Asia.

== History ==
Investcorp was co-founded in 1982 by Nemir Kirdar, Elias Hallak, Savio Tung, Mike Merritt, and Cem Cesmig and acquired Tiffany & Co in 1984, floating in 1987. In 1988, Maurizio Gucci sold almost 47.8% of Gucci to Investcorp, and withheld the other 50% until 1993.

The company diversified in 1996 into Absolute Return Investments. Kirdar stepped down as CEO and executive chairman in 2015. With Kirdar resigning, Mohammad Alardhi became the Executive Chairman of the company. The changes also involved an update to the business model, which is now focused on raising institutional capital from global markets, and diversifying strategies further. In 2024, Investcorp announced changes to its leadership team, with Alardhi taking on further responsibilities previously held by the co-CEO as Executive Chairman, and Rishi Kapoor being appointed Vice Chairman and Chief Investment Officer. This restructure of the leadership team also included reorganising investment activities under three business verticals; Private Equity, led by Daniel Lopez Cruz, Real Assets, led by Herb Myers, and Credit, led by Neil Rickard in Europe and Corey Geis in the US. Investcorp's Private Wealth business and distributions are led by Yusef Al Yusef.

Investcorp made several acquisitions between 2016 and 2019, pushing into China with investments into tech and the food sector. In 2019, the company also pushed into the US market with the acquisition of Mercury Capital, which ceased operations in late 2024 "due to the very challenging capital raising environment". Investcorp's portfolio company, Moneybookers, ended its relationship with WikiLeaks in August 2010.

The company was regulated in Bahrain as a wholesale bank until 2019, when it voluntarily surrendered its wholesale banking license. It remained listed on the Bahrain Bourse (BSE) for four decades until 2021, when it delisted itself as a result of low trading volumes.

In 2023, Investcorp acquired a 50% stake in the infrastructure business of the firm Corsair, creating a new joint entity, Investcorp Corsair. The new entity focuses on a scalable investment strategy in transportation, logistics and broader infrastructure.

In 2024, the firm launched a $1 billion fund to invest further in China, and the GCC. The company has since announced further investment in the US as well, joining a $4.2 billion project to redevelop JFK international airport, due to be completed by 2025.

In the same year, it also announced it had partnered with specialist Securitize to make its latest GP-stakes fund available for individual investors on a public blockchain. Additionally, in early 2025 the firm launched its ‘Investcorp Wealth’ app, expanding its offerings towards individual investors.

== Investment areas ==
=== Private equity ===
Investcorp's traditional activity is private equity. This includes mid-size companies in North America, Western Europe and MENA including Turkey, as well as technology lower mid-cap investment, through Investcorp Technology Partners.

In 2023, Investcorp closed its North American Private Equity Fund I at over $1.2 billion in capital commitments, focusing on control buy-out investments in middle market services businesses in North America.

In 2024, the firm's Investcorp Technology Partners V (“ITP V”) fund closed at $570 million in total commitments, investing in companies globally within software, data/analytics, cybersecurity and fintech. The first exit from the ITP V fund was announced in July 2025, with the launch of a single-asset continuation fund for the Italian cybersecurity firm HWG Sababa.

The past and present portfolio includes over 175 investments. Selected past investments include:

- Tiffany & Co. – retailers of jewelry and luxury goods – acquired 1984, floated 1987
- Gucci – designer, producer and distributor of luxury accessories and apparel – acquired from 1989 to 1993, floated 1996
- Leica Geosystems – measuring instrument manufacturer acquired 1998, floated 2000
- Circle K – chain of convenience stores – acquired 1993, sold 1996
- Jostens – US provider of school-related affinity products – acquired 2000, sold 2003
- Neptune Technology Group – US manufacturer of water meters – acquired 2001, sold 2003
- MW Manufacturers – a US maker of windows and patio doors – acquired 2002, sold 2004
- Hilding Anders – European mattress and bed manufacturer – acquired 2003, sold 2006
- Apcoa – European parking management providers – acquired 2004, sold 2007
- American Tire Distributors – the largest US independent tire distributor – acquired in 2005, sold in 2010
- Moody International – international provider of quality and safety services – acquired 2007, sold 2011
- FleetPride – North America's largest distributor of truck and trailer parts – acquired 2006, sold 2012
- ProUnlimited – United States–based software and services firm – acquired in 2014 jointly by InvestCorp & Bahrain Mumtalakat Holding Company.
- Corneliani – Italian luxury brand in June 2016
- Ageras – Denmark-based online marketplace for professional services acquired 2017
- Avira – Germany-based cybersecurity company – acquired 2020, sold to NortonLifeLock in 2021
- United Talent Agency – global talent and entertainment company – acquired 2018, sold 2022
- Dainese – competitive motorcycling racing wear – acquired 2017
- Sonos Group, provider of specialized clinical trial services to the global pharmaceutical and biotechnology industry – acquired 2020
- XpressBees, end-to-end e-commerce logistics platform in India – acquired 2020
- FreshToHome, one of the world's largest fully integrated online brands in fresh fish and meat – acquired 2020
- Fortune International, specialty distributor of seafood and gourmet food products – acquired 2020
- RESA Power, provider of power services that enhances the safety, reliability, and efficiency of electric power systems – acquired 2021
- CloudCare, Italian tech-enabled digital sales and markets solutions platform – acquired 2021
- Marble Point Credit, US specialist asset manager focused exclusively on managing CLOs (collateralised loan obligation) and portfolios of broadly syndicated leveraged loans – acquired 2022
- VEDA, German payroll-as-a-service provider – acquired 2024
- BCTS, US HVAC and plumbing services – acquired 2024
- Salla, Saudi Arabian e-commerce platform – invested in 2024
- NSEIT, Digital technology arm of the India's National Stock Exchange – acquired 2024
- Stowe Family Law, UK family law firm, 2024
- Epipoli, Italian alternative payments solution provider, 2025
- Miebach, German supply chain and logistics consultancy, 2025
- Port of Duqm in Oman – agreement to invest $500 million, 2025

=== Real Assets ===
The real estate division, which expanded in 2024 to include both Real Estate and Infrastructure, is based in New York and London. This line of business sources and performs due diligence, and arranges financing and the acquisition of US and European properties and US commercial mortgage debt positions. The investment in these properties or loans is typically aggregated into a series of multi-investment portfolios for placement to clients. Since 1996, Investcorp has acquired over 1,400 properties for a total value of approximately $26billion. Investcorp is among the top 5 largest cross-border buyers of US real estate, according to Real Capital Analytics (RCA).

In 2025, Investcorp was listed as one of the world's largest private real estate companies by PERE, and one of the world's largest private equity firms by Private Equity International. It also saw Starwood's John McCarthy join the team as Advisory Director, to help guide the firms' Real Assets initiatives.

Recent investments include:

- University of Florida and University of Texas, two student housing properties, 2024
- Texas A&M University, Texas State University, University of Kentucky and University of Oklahoma student properties, 2024
- Letterkenny retail part and Deerpark Retail Park, Irish retail sites in County Kerry, 2024
- Dallas & Atlanta Infill Portfolio, 16-building portfolio, 2024
- West Coast Infill Portfolio, 17 building portfolio, 2024
- Tampa Industrial Portfolio, 8 building industrial portfolio, 2024
- Minneapolis and Baltimore Portfolio, 27 properties, 2025

=== Absolute Return Investments ===
Established in 1996, Investcorp's Absolute Return Investments business grew to an approximate value of $3.5 billion capital under management, out of which approximately $0.2 billion is reserved for proprietary investments. The Absolute Return Investments business provides institutional investors with access to its emerging manager program, investing with and seeding early-stage managers who, according to Investcorp research, outperform larger hedge funds on a risk-adjusted basis. In 2020, Investcorp merged its Absolute Return Investments business with Tages Group, a European alternative asset management firm, creating a 50/50 joint venture.

=== Credit management ===
Investcorp Credit Management was formed after the acquisition and integration of the debt management business of 3i (“3iDM”) in 2017. Investcorp Credit Management has assets under management of over $22 billion. Based in London, New York, and Singapore, they manage funds that invest primarily in senior secured corporate debt issued by mid and large-cap corporates in Western Europe and the US.

=== Investcorp Insurance ===
In October 2021, the company launched its Investcorp Insurance Solutions platform which provides investment management services to meet the investment needs of insurers.

=== Recent exits ===
In May 2024, Investcorp announced a partial exit from its stake in NephroPlus, a dialysis provider in Asia. This came as part of a funding round and investment from private equity firm Quadria Capital into NephroPlus.

In February 2025, Investcorp agreed to sell its majority stake in Contentserv, an AI-powered Product Information Management and Product Experience management provider.

In April 2025, Investcorp completed the sale of Resa Power to Kohlberg. Resa Power, a power systems provider and electrical testing solutions provider that has seen its revenue increase fourfold since its acquisition in 2021. This exit was the first from Investcorp's $1.2 billion North America Private Equity Fund I.

In April 2025, Investcorp announced it had sold its US industrial real estate portfolio, with a 40% gain over its initial purchase price. Similarly, in May 2025, Investcorp announced it had exited 12 residential multiple-occupancy real estate assets across five states in the US. The exit was achieved at a premium, with an aggregate price of $550 million.

In May 2025, Investcorp completed its exit from Indian value-fashion retailer Citykart, selling its entire stake to TPG NewQuest and A91 Partners.
