= List of Nordic Academy Award winners and nominees =

This is a list of Academy Award winners and nominees from Nordic countries: Denmark, Finland, Iceland, Norway, and Sweden. This list is current as of the 97th Academy Awards.

== Acting ==
=== Actor in a Leading Role ===
Actor
Year	Name	Country	Film	Status	Milestone / Notes
1987	Max von Sydow	(Sweden) / (France)	Pelle the Conqueror (Pelle erobreren)	Nominated	
2007	Viggo Mortensen	(United States) / (Denmark)	Eastern Promises	Nominated	
2016	Viggo Mortensen	(United States) / (Denmark)	Captain Fantastic	Nominated	
2018	Viggo Mortensen	(United States) / (Denmark)	Green Book	Nominated	

=== Actress in a Leading Role ===
Actress
Year	Name	Country	Film	Status	Milestone / Notes
1929–1930	Greta Garbo	(Sweden)	Anna Christie	Nominated	
1929–1930	Greta Garbo	(Sweden)	Romance	Nominated	
1936	Greta Garbo	(Sweden)	Camille	Nominated	
1939	Greta Garbo	(Sweden)	Ninotchka	Nominated	
1942	Ingrid Bergman	(Sweden)	For Whom the Bell Tolls	Nominated	
1944	Ingrid Bergman	(Sweden)	Gaslight	Won	
1945	Ingrid Bergman	(Sweden)	The Bells of St. Mary's	Nominated	
1948	Ingrid Bergman	(Sweden)	Joan of Arc	Nominated	
1956	Ingrid Bergman	(Sweden)	Anastasia	Won	
1972	Liv Ullmann	(Norway)	The Emigrants (Utvandrarna)	Nominated	Ullman is a Norwegian actress who was born in Japan.
1975	Ann-Margret	(Sweden)	Tommy	Nominated	
1976	Liv Ullmann	(Norway)	Face to Face (Ansikte mot ansikte)	Nominated	
1978	Ingrid Bergman	(Sweden)	Autumn Sonata (Höstsonaten)	Nominated	
2020	Scarlett Johansson	(United States) / (Denmark)	Marriage Story	Nominated	Johansson holds dual American and Danish citizenship.
2025	Renate Reinsve	(Norway)	Sentimental Value	Nominated	

=== Actor in a Supporting Role ===
Supporting Actor
Year	Name	Country	Film	Status	Milestone / Notes
2011	Max von Sydow	(Sweden) / (France)	Extremely Loud and Incredibly Close	Nominated	
2025	Stellan Skarsgård	(Sweden)	Sentimental Value	Nominated	

=== Actress in a Supporting Role ===
Supporting Actress
Year	Name	Country	Film	Status	Milestone / Notes
1971	Ann-Margret	(Sweden)	Carnal Knowledge	Nominated	
1974	Ingrid Bergman	(Sweden)	Murder on the Orient Express	Won	
1989	Lena Olin	(Sweden)	Enemies: A Love Story	Nominated	
2015	Alicia Vikander	(Sweden)	The Danish Girl	Won	
2020	Scarlett Johansson	(United States) / (Denmark)	Jojo Rabbit	Nominated	Johansson holds dual American and Danish citizenship.
2025	Inga Ibsdotter Lilleaas	(Norway)	Sentimental Value	Nominated	

== Production Design ==
Production Design
Year	Name	Country	Film	Status	Milestone / Notes
1931	Max Rée	(Denmark)	Cimarron	Won	
1955	Tambi Larsen	(Denmark)	The Rose Tattoo	Won	Shared with Hal Pereira, Sam Comer and Arthur Krams.
1963	Tambi Larsen	(Denmark)	Hud	Nominated	Shared with Hal Pereira, Sam Comer and Robert R. Benton.
1965	Tambi Larsen	(Denmark)	The Spy Who Came in from the Cold	Nominated	Shared with Hal Pereira, Ted Marshall and Josie MacAvin.
1970	Tambi Larsen	(Denmark)	The Molly MaGuires	Nominated	Shared with Darrell Silvera.
1981	Tambi Larsen	(Denmark)	Heaven's Gate	Nominated	Shared with James L. Berkey.
1961	Eric Orbom	(Sweden)	Spartacus	Won	Shared with Alexander Golitzen, Russell A. Gausman and Julia Heron.
1982	Anna Asp	(Sweden)	Fanny and Alexander (Fanny och Alexander)	Won	

== Cinematography ==
Cinematography
Year	Name	Country	Film	Status	Milestone / Notes
1972	Sven Nykvist	(Sweden)	Cries and Whispers (Viskningar och rop)	Won	
1982	Sven Nykvist	(Sweden)	Fanny and Alexander (Fanny och Alexander)	Won	
1988	Sven Nykvist	(Sweden)	The Unbearable Lightness of Being	Nominated	
1989	Mikael Salomon	(Denmark)	The Abyss	Nominated	
2016	Linus Sandgren	(Sweden)	La La Land	Won	
2017	Hoyte van Hoytema	(Netherlands) / (Sweden)	Dunkirk	Nominated	Hoytema is a Dutch-Swedish cinematographer.
2017	Dan Laustsen	(Denmark)	The Shape of Water	Nominated	
2021	Dan Laustsen	(Denmark)	Nightmare Alley	Nominated	
2023	Hoyte van Hoytema	(Netherlands) / (Sweden)	Oppenheimer	Won	
2025	Dan Laustsen	(Denmark)	Frankenstein	Nominated	

== Costume Design ==
Costume Design
Year	Name	Country	Film	Status	Milestone / Notes
1960	Marik Vos-Lundh	(Russia) / (Sweden)	The Virgin Spring (Jungfrukällan)	Nominated	Vos-Lundh is a Russian-born Swedish costume designer.
1972	Marik Vos-Lundh	(Russia) / (Sweden)	Cries and Whispers (Viskningar och rop)	Nominated	Vos-Lundh is a Russian-born Swedish costume designer.
1975	Ulla-Britt Söderlund	(Sweden)	Barry Lyndon	Won	Shared with Milena Canonero.
1975	Karin Erskine; Henny Noremark	(Sweden)	The Magic Flute (Trollflöjten)	Nominated	
1982	Marik Vos-Lundh	(Russia) / (Sweden)	Fanny and Alexander (Fanny och Alexander)	Won	

== Makeup and Hairstyling ==
Makeup and Hairstyling
Year	Name	Country	Film	Status	Milestone / Notes
2014	Love Larson; Eva Von Bahr	(Sweden)	The 100-Year-Old Man Who Climbed Out of the Window and Disappeared	Nominated	
2015	Love Larson; Eva Von Bahr	(Sweden)	A Man Called Ove	Nominated	
2018	Göran Lundström; Pamela Goldammer	(Sweden)	Border	Nominated	
2021	Love Larson; Eva Von Bahr	(Sweden)	Dune	Nominated	Shared with Donald Mowat.
2021	Göran Lundström; Anna Carin Lock	(Sweden)	House of Gucci	Nominated	Shared with Frederic Aspiras.
2025	Thomas Foldberg; Anne Cathrine Sauerberg	(Denmark)	The Ugly Stepsister	Nominated	

== Editing ==
Editing
Year	Name	Country	Film	Status	Milestone / Notes
1983	Tom Rolf	(Sweden)	The Right Stuff	Won	Shared with Glenn Farr, Lisa Fruchtman, Stephen A. Rotter and Douglas Stewart.
2020	Mikkel E. G. Nielsen	(Denmark)	Sound of Metal	Won	
2022	Mikkel E. G. Nielsen	(Denmark)	The Banshees of Inisherin	Nominated	
2025	Olivier Bugge Coutté	(Denmark)	Sentimental Value	Nominated	

== Visual Effects ==
Visual Effects
Year	Name	Country	Film	Status	Milestone / Notes
1991	Mikael Salomon	(Denmark)	Backdraft	Nominated	

== Director ==
Director
Year	Name	Country	Film	Status	Milestone / Notes
1972	Jan Troell	(Sweden)	The Emigrants (Utvandrarna)	Nominated	
1973	Ingmar Bergman	(Sweden)	Cries and Whispers (Viskningar och rop)	Nominated	
1976	Ingmar Bergman	(Sweden)	Face to Face (Ansikte mot ansikte)	Nominated	
1983	Ingmar Bergman	(Sweden)	Fanny and Alexander (Fanny och Alexander)	Nominated	
1987	Lasse Hallström	(Sweden)	My Life as a Dog (Mitt liv som hund)	Nominated	
1999	Lasse Hallström	(Sweden)	The Cider House Rules	Nominated	
2014	Morten Tyldum	(Norway)	The Imitation Game	Nominated	
2020	Thomas Vinterberg	(Denmark)	Another Round (Druk)	Nominated	
2022	Ruben Östlund	(Sweden)	Triangle of Sadness	Nominated	
2025	Joachim Trier	(Denmark) / (Norway)	Sentimental Value	Nominated	

== International Feature Film ==
This list focuses on films from Nordic countries that won or were nominated for the International Feature Film award.

International Feature Film
Year	Film	Country	Director	Status	Milestone / Notes
1956	Qivitoq	(Denmark)	Erik Balling	Nominated	
1957	Nine Lives	(Norway)	Arne Skouen	Nominated	
1959	Paw	(Denmark)	Astrid Henning-Jensen	Nominated	
1960	The Virgin Spring	(Sweden)	Ingmar Bergman	Won	
1961	Harry and the Butler	(Denmark)	Bent Christensen	Nominated	
1961	Through a Glass Darkly	(Sweden)	Ingmar Bergman	Won	
1964	Raven's End	(Sweden)	Bo Widerberg	Nominated	
1965	Dear John	(Sweden)	Lars-Magnus Lindgren	Nominated	
1969	Ådalen '31	(Sweden)	Bo Widerberg	Nominated	
1971	The Emigrants	(Sweden)	Jan Troell	Nominated	
1972	The New Land	(Sweden)	Jan Troell	Nominated	
1982	The Flight of the Eagle	(Sweden)	Jan Troell	Nominated	
1983	Fanny and Alexander	(Sweden)	Ingmar Bergman	Won	
1987	Babette's Feast	(Denmark)	Gabriel Axel	Won	
1987	Pathfinder	(Norway)	Nils Gaup	Nominated	
1988	Pelle the Conqueror	(Denmark)	Bille August	Won	
1989	Waltzing Regitze	(Denmark)	Kaspar Rostrup	Nominated	
1991	Children of Nature	(Iceland)	Friðrik Þór Friðriksson	Nominated	
1991	The Ox	(Sweden)	Sven Nykvist	Nominated	
1995	All Things Fair	(Sweden)	Bo Widerberg	Nominated	
1996	The Other Side of Sunday	(Norway)	Berit Nesheim	Nominated	
1999	Under the Sun	(Sweden)	Colin Nutley	Nominated	
2001	Elling	(Norway)	Petter Næss	Nominated	
2002	The Man Without a Past	(Finland)	Aki Kaurismäki	Nominated	
2003	Evil	(Sweden)	Mikael Håfström	Nominated	
2004	As It Is in Heaven	(Sweden)	Kay Pollak	Nominated	
2006	After the Wedding	(Denmark)	Susanne Bier	Nominated	
2010	In a Better World	(Denmark)	Susanne Bier	Won	
2012	Kon-Tiki	(Norway)	Joachim Rønning and Espen Sandberg	Nominated	
2012	A Royal Affair	(Denmark)	Nikolaj Arcel	Nominated	
2013	The Hunt	(Denmark)	Thomas Vinterberg	Nominated	
2015	A War	(Denmark)	Tobias Lindholm	Nominated	
2016	Land of Mine	(Denmark)	Martin Zandvliet	Nominated	
2016	A Man Called Ove	(Sweden)	Hannes Holm	Nominated	
2017	The Square	(Sweden)	Ruben Östlund	Nominated	
2020	Another Round	(Denmark)	Thomas Vinterberg	Won	
2021	Flee	(Denmark)	Jonas Poher Rasmussen	Nominated	
2021	The Worst Person in the World	(Norway)	Joachim Trier	Nominated	
2024	The Girl with the Needle	(Denmark)	Magnus von Horn	Nominated	
2025	Sentimental Value	(Norway)	Joachim Trier	Won	

== Animated Feature ==
This list focuses on Nordic films that won or were nominated for the Best Animated Feature award.

Animated Feature
Year	Name	Country	Film	Status	Milestone / Notes
2021	Jonas Poher Rasmussen; Monica Hellström; Signe Byrge Sørensen	(Denmark)	Flee	Nominated	Shared with Charlotte de la Gournerie.

== Animated Short ==
This list focuses on Nordic films that won or were nominated for the animated, short film award.

Animated Short
Year	Name	Country	Film	Status	Milestone / Notes
1999	Torill Kove	(Norway) / (Canada)	My Grandmother Ironed the King's Shirts	Nominated	Kove is a Norwegian-born Canadian film director and animator.
2006	Torill Kove	(Norway) / (Canada)	The Danish Poet	Won	Kove is a Norwegian-born Canadian film director and animator.
2007	Gary Rydstrom (US-born)	(Sweden)	Lifted	Nominated	
2020	Gísli Darri Halldórsson; Arnar Gunnarsson	(Iceland)	Yes-People	Nominated	
2022	Sara Gunnarsdóttir	(Iceland)	My Year of Dicks	Nominated	Shared with Pamela Ribon

== Live Action Short ==
This list focuses on Nordic films that won or were nominated for the live action, short film award.

Live Action Short
Year	Film	Country	Director and Producer	Status	Milestone / Notes
1996	Ernst & Lyset	(Denmark)	Anders Thomas Jensen; Kim Magnusson	Nominated	
1997	Wolfgang	(Denmark)	Anders Thomas Jensen; Kim Magnusson	Nominated	
1998	Election Night	(Denmark)	Anders Thomas Jensen; Kim Magnusson	Won	
1998	Victor	(Sweden)	Simon Sandquist; Joel Bergvall	Nominated	
1999	Major and Minor Miracles	(Sweden)	Marcus A. Olsson	Nominated	
2002	Der Er En Yndig Mand	(Denmark)	Martin Strange-Hansen; Mie Andreasen	Won	
2005	The Last Farm	(Iceland)	Rúnar Rúnarsson	Nominated	
2006	Helmer & Son	(Denmark)	Søren Pilmark; Kim Magnusson	Nominated	
2007	At Night	(Denmark)	Christian E. Christiansen; Louise Vesth	Nominated	
2008	The Pig	(Denmark)	Tivi Magnusson; Dorte Høgh	Nominated	
2009	The New Tenants	(Denmark)	Joachim Back; Tivi Magnusson	Won	
2009	Instead of Abracadabra	(Sweden)	Patrik Eklund; Mathias Fjellström	Nominated	
2011	~~Tuba Atlantic~~	(Norway)	~~Hallvar Witzø~~	Nominated	Nomination was rescinded after it was revealed the short had aired on television prior to its theatrical release.
2013	Helium	(Denmark)	Anders Walter; Kim Magnusson	Won	
2013	Pitääkö mun kaikki hoitaa?	(Finland)	Selma Vilhunen; Kirsikka Saari	Nominated	
2016	Silent Nights	(Denmark)	Aske Bang; Kim Magnusson	Nominated	
2021	On My Mind	(Denmark)	Martin Strange-Hansen; Kim Magnusson	Nominated	
2022	Ivalu	(Denmark)	Anders Walter; Rebecca Pruzan	Nominated	
2022	Night Ride	(Norway)	Eirik Tveiten; Gaute Lid Larssen	Nominated	
2023	Knight of Fortune	(Denmark)	Lasse Lyskjær Noer; Christian Norlyk	Nominated	

== Documentary ==
This list focuses on Nordic films that won or were nominated for the Best Documentary award.

Documentary
Year	Film	Country	Director / Recipient	Status	Milestone / Notes
1951	Kon-Tiki	(Sweden)	Olle Nordemar	Won	Producer / Editor. Norwegian film, Swedish recipient.
1971	Ra	(Norway)	Thor Heyerdahl and Lennart Ehrenborg	Nominated	
2009	Burma VJ	(Denmark)	Anders Østergaard and Lise Lense-Møller	Nominated	
2012	Searching for Sugar Man	(Sweden)	Malik Bendjelloul	Won	Shared with Simon Chinn.
2013	The Act of Killing	(Denmark)	Signe Byrge Sørensen	Nominated	Shared with Joshua Oppenheimer.
2015	The Look of Silence	(Denmark)	Signe Byrge Sørensen	Nominated	Shared with Joshua Oppenheimer.
2017	Last Men in Aleppo	(Denmark)	Søren Steen Jespersen	Nominated	Shared with Feras Fayyad and Kareem Abeed.
2019	The Cave	(Denmark)	Kirstine Barfod and Sigrid Dyekjær	Nominated	Shared with Feras Fayyad.
2021	Flee	(Denmark)	Jonas Poher Rasmussen, Monica Hellström, and Signe Byrge Sørensen	Nominated	Shared with Charlotte De La Gournerie.
2022	A House Made of Splinters	(Denmark)	Monica Hellström, Simon Lereng Vilmont	Nominated	
2024	Black Box Diaries	(Sweden)	Hanna Aqvilin	Nominated	Shared with Shiori Itō and Eric Nyari

== Best Documentary (Short Subject) ==
Documentary (Short Subject)
Year	Film	Country	Director / Recipient	Status	Milestone / Notes
1960	A City Called Copenhagen	(Denmark)	Statens Filmcentral and The Danish Government Film Office	Nominated	

== Music ==
=== Original Song ===
Original Song
Year	Name	Country	Film	Song	Status	Milestone / Notes
2000	Björk; Sjón	(Iceland)	Dancer in the Dark	"I've Seen It All"	Nominated	
2000	Lars von Trier	(Denmark)	Dancer in the Dark	"I've Seen It All"	Nominated	
2007	Markéta Irglová	(Czech Republic) / (Iceland)	Once	"Falling Slowly"	Won	Irglová holds dual Czech and Icelandic citizenship. Shared with Glen Hansard.
2016	Max Martin; Shellback	(Sweden)	Trolls	"Can't Stop the Feeling!"	Nominated	Shared with Justin Timberlake.
2020	Fat Max Gsus; Rickard Göransson	(Sweden)	Eurovision Song Contest: The Story of Fire Saga	"Husavik"	Nominated	Shared with Savan Kotecha.
2022	Ludwig Göransson	(Sweden)	Black Panther: Wakanda Forever	"Lift Me Up"	Nominated	Shared with Tems, Rihanna, and Ryan Coogler.
2025	Ludwig Göransson	(Sweden)	Sinners	"I Lied to You"	Nominated	Shared with Raphael Saadiq.

=== Original Score ===
Original Score
Year	Name	Country	Film	Status	Milestone / Notes
1937	Leigh Harline (US-born)	(Sweden)	Snow White and the Seven Dwarfs	Nominated	
1940	Leigh Harline (US-born)	(Sweden)	Pinocchio	Won	
1942	Leigh Harline (US-born)	(Sweden)	The Pride of the Yankees	Nominated	
1942	Leigh Harline (US-born)	(Sweden)	You Were Never Lovelier	Nominated	
1943	Leigh Harline (US-born)	(Sweden)	Johnny Come Lately	Nominated	
1943	Leigh Harline (US-born)	(Sweden)	The Sky's the Limit	Nominated	
1962	Leigh Harline (US-born)	(Sweden)	The Wonderful World of the Brothers Grimm	Nominated	
2014	Jóhann Jóhannsson	(Iceland)	The Theory of Everything	Nominated	
2015	Jóhann Jóhannsson	(Iceland)	Sicario	Nominated	
2018	Ludwig Göransson	(Sweden)	Black Panther	Won	
2019	Hildur Guðnadóttir	(Iceland)	Joker	Won	
2023	Ludwig Göransson	(Sweden)	Oppenheimer	Won	
2025	Ludwig Göransson	(Sweden)	Sinners	Won	

== Best Picture ==
Best Picture
Year	Name	Country	Film	Status	Milestone / Notes
1972	Bengt Forslund	(Sweden)	The Emigrants (Utvandrarna)	Nominated	
1973	Ingmar Bergman	(Sweden)	Cries and Whispers (Viskningar och rop)	Nominated	
2025	Maria Ekerhovd Andrea Berentsen Ottmar	(Norway)	Sentimental Value (Affeksjonsverdi)	Nominated	
2025	Lars Knudsen	(Denmark)	Bugonia	Nominated	Shared with Ed Guiney, Andrew Lowe, Yorgos Lanthimos, and Emma Stone

== Writing ==
=== Adapted Screenplay ===
Adapted Screenplay
Year	Name	Country	Film	Status	Milestone / Notes
1972	Bengt Forslund; Jan Troell	(Sweden)	The Emigrants (Utvandrarna)	Nominated	
1987	Per Berglund; Brasse Brännström; Lasse Hallström; Reidar Jönsson	(Sweden)	My Life as a Dog (Mitt liv som hund)	Nominated	
2007	Hawk Ostby	(Norway)	Children of Men	Nominated	Otsby was born in India, but grew up in Norway. Shared with Alfonso Cuarón, David Arata, Timothy J. Sexton, and Mark Fergus.

=== Original Screenplay ===
Original Screenplay
Year	Name	Country	Film	Status	Milestone / Notes
1959	Ingmar Bergman	(Sweden)	Wild Strawberries (Smultronstället)	Nominated	
1962	Ingmar Bergman	(Sweden)	Through a Glass Darkly (Såsom i en spegel)	Nominated	
1973	Ingmar Bergman	(Sweden)	Cries and Whispers (Viskningar och rop)	Nominated	
1978	Ingmar Bergman	(Sweden)	Autumn Sonata (Höstsonaten)	Nominated	
1983	Ingmar Bergman	(Sweden)	Fanny and Alexander (Fanny och Alexander)	Nominated	
2021	Joachim Trier; Eskil Vogt	(Norway)	The Worst Person in the World (Verdens verste menneske)	Nominated	
2022	Ruben Östlund	(Sweden)	Triangle of Sadness	Nominated	
2024	Mona Fastvold	(Norway)	The Brutalist	Nominated	Shared with Brady Corbet
2025	Joachim Trier; Eskil Vogt	(Norway)	Sentimental Value (Affeksjonsverdi)	Nominated	

== Sound ==
=== Sound ===
Sound
Year	Name	Country	Film	Status	Milestone / Notes
1992	Gary Rydstrom US-born, 1/2-swedish?	(Sweden)	Terminator 2: Judgment Day	Won	
1992	Gary Rydstrom US-born, 1/2-swedish?	(Sweden)	Backdraft	Nominated	
1994	Gary Rydstrom US-born, 1/2-swedish?	(Sweden)	Jurassic Park	Won	
1998	Gary Rydstrom US-born, 1/2-swedish?	(Sweden)	Titanic	Won	
1999	Gary Rydstrom US-born, 1/2-swedish?	(Sweden)	Saving Private Ryan	Won	
2021	Gary Rydstrom US-born, 1/2-swedish?	(Sweden)	West Side Story	Nominated	

=== Sound Editing ===
Sound Editing
Year	Name	Country	Film	Status	Milestone / Notes
1992	Gary Rydstrom	(Sweden)	Terminator 2: Judgment Day	Won	
1992	Gary Rydstrom	(Sweden)	Backdraft	Nominated	
1994	Gary Rydstrom	(Sweden)	Jurassic Park	Won	
1995	Per Hallberg	(Sweden)	Braveheart	Won	Shared with Lon Bender.
1997	Per Hallberg	(Sweden)	Face/Off	Nominated	Shared with Mark Stoeckinger.
1999	Gary Rydstrom	(Sweden)	Saving Private Ryan	Won	
2002	Gary Rydstrom	(Sweden)	Monsters, Inc.	Nominated	
2003	Gary Rydstrom	(Sweden)	Minority Report	Nominated	
2004	Gary Rydstrom	(Sweden)	Finding Nemo	Nominated	
2004	Paul N. J. Ottosson	(Sweden)	Spider-Man 2	Nominated	
2007	Per Hallberg	(Sweden)	The Bourne Ultimatum	Won	Shared with Karen Baker Landers.
2009	Paul N. J. Ottosson	(Sweden)	The Hurt Locker	Won	
2012	Paul N. J. Ottosson	(Sweden)	Zero Dark Thirty	Won (Tied)	
2012	Per Hallberg	(Sweden)	Skyfall	Won (Tied)	Shared with Karen Baker Landers.
2012	Gary Rydstrom	(Sweden)	War Horse	Nominated	

=== Sound Mixing ===
Sound Mixing
Year	Name	Country	Film	Status	Milestone / Notes
2000	Gary Rydstrom US-born 1/2-swedish?	(Sweden)	Star Wars: Episode I – The Phantom Menace	Nominated	
2009	Paul N. J. Ottosson	(Sweden)	The Hurt Locker	Won	Shared with Ray Beckett.
2011	Bo Persson	(Sweden)	The Girl with the Dragon Tattoo	Nominated	Shared with David Parker, Michael Semanick and Ren Klyce.
2012	Gary Rydstrom	(Sweden)	Lincoln	Nominated	
2013	Gary Rydstrom	(Sweden)	War Horse	Nominated	
2016	Gary Rydstrom	(Sweden)	Bridge of Spies	Nominated	
2020	Gary Rydstrom	(Sweden)	Ad Astra	Nominated	

== Special Categories ==
=== Irving G. Thalberg Memorial Award ===
This list focuses on recipients of Irving G. Thalberg Memorial Award.

Irving G. Thalberg Memorial Award
Year	Name	Country	Awarded	Status	Milestone / Notes
1971	Ingmar Bergman	(Sweden)	43rd Academy Awards	Honored	

=== Academy Honorary Award ===
This list focuses on recipients of the Academy Honorary Award.

Academy Honorary Award
Year	Name	Country	Status	Milestone / Notes
1954	Greta Garbo	(Sweden)	Honored	"for her unforgettable screen performances"
2021	Liv Ullmann	(Norway)	Honored	"her bravery and emotional transparency has gifted audiences with deeply affecting screen portrayals"

== Technical & Scientific ==
Academy Scientific and Technical Awards
Year	Name	Country	Status	Milestone / Notes
1991	Bengt O. Orhall, Kenneth Lund, Bjorn Selin and Kjell Hogberg of AB Film-Teknik	(Sweden)	Honored	Technical Achievement Award, for the development and manufacture of the Mark IV film subtitling processor, which has increased the speed, simplified the operation and improved the quality of subtitling
2002	Rune Ericson	(Sweden)	Honored	Award of Commendation, for Super-16
2009	Steve Hylén	(Sweden)	Honored	Technical Achievement Award
2010	Björn Hedén	(Sweden)	Honored	Technical Achievement Award
2015	Magnus Wrenninge	(Sweden)	Honored	(Technical Achievement Award; For leading the design and development of Field3D - storing and accessing voxel data efficiently, allowing interchange between previously incompatible modeling, simulation and rendering software.
2020	Fredrik Limsäter, Björn Rydahl and Mattias Lagergren	(Sweden)	Honored	Technical Achievement Award

== Number of nominations/wins by country ==
Rank	Country	No. of nominations	No. of wins
1	Sweden	82	35
2	Denmark	40	16
3	Norway	14	2
4	Iceland	8	1
5	Finland	2	0
