= Santa Barbara International Film Festival =

Annual film festival held in Santa Barbara, USA

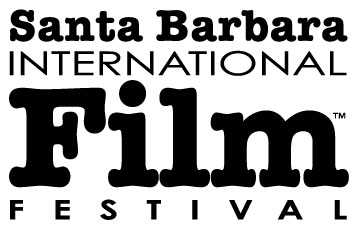
- Location: Santa Barbara, California, United States
- Founded: 1986; 40 years ago
- Founded by: Phyllis de Picciotto
- Most recent: 2026
- Directors: Roger Durling (Executive Director)
- Festival date: Opening: 4 February 2026; Closing: 14 February 2026
- Website: sbiff.org

Current: 41st Santa Barbara International Film Festival chronology
- 2027 2025

The Santa Barbara International Film Festival (SBIFF) is an eleven-day film festival held every February in Santa Barbara, California, since 1986. The festival annually screens over two hundreds feature films and shorts from different countries. SBIFF also includes celebrity tributes, industry panels, and education programs.

== History ==
Over the years, SBIFF has invited numerous 'potential award-winning celebrities', including Cate Blanchett, Guillermo Del Toro, Laura Dern, Leonardo DiCaprio, Angelina Jolie, Jennifer Lawrence, Heath Ledger, Eddie Redmayne, Martin Scorsese, Michelle Yeoh and Kate Winslet.

In 2006, a third of the festival's slots were dedicated to films by Hispanic filmmakers. Programming categories at that time included Nature films, "surf flicks" and adventure-sports films.

In addition to its annual festival in February, the SBIFF "Cinema Society" hosts programming year round at the Riviera Theater in Santa Barbara.

== Awards ==
Festival awards
	Years
10-10-10 Student Filmmaking Competition	
10-10-10 Student Screenwriting Competition	
American Riviera Award	
Arlington Award	2024–
Audience Choice Award	
Best Documentary Film Award	
Best International Film Award	
Bruce Corwin Award for Best Animation Short Film	
Bruce Corwin Award for Best Live Action Short Film	
Fund for Santa Barbara Social Justice Award	
Hammond Cinema Vanguard Award	
Kirk Douglas Award For Excellence In Film	2006–
Maltin Modern Master Award Known as the Modern Master Award from 1995 to 2014	1995–
Montecito Award	2005–
Nueva Vision Award	
Outstanding Directors of the Year Award	2009–
Outstanding Performer(s) of the Year Award	
Panavision Spirit Award for Independent Cinema	
Variety Artisans Award	
Virtuosos Award	

=== 10-10-10 student film competition ===
One feature of the film festival is the 10-10-10 competition. Students enrolled at Santa Barbara area high schools and colleges are invited to submit either a 10-page sample of writing for the Screenwriting portion of the competition or a five-minute sample of their best filmmaking efforts for the directing portion. Ten writers are selected to write one 10-minute script each; the scripts are then matched with the ten filmmakers. Those students then have ten days to shoot and edit the completed ten-minute short film, during the ten days of the festival. Films are screened and winners are announced on closing night. A selection committee consisting of representatives from each school, Industry professionals and SBIFF representatives select the participants.

The program was extended into a summer camp where area youths from schools and local Boys & Girls Clubs learned filmmaking skills.

=== American Riviera Award ===
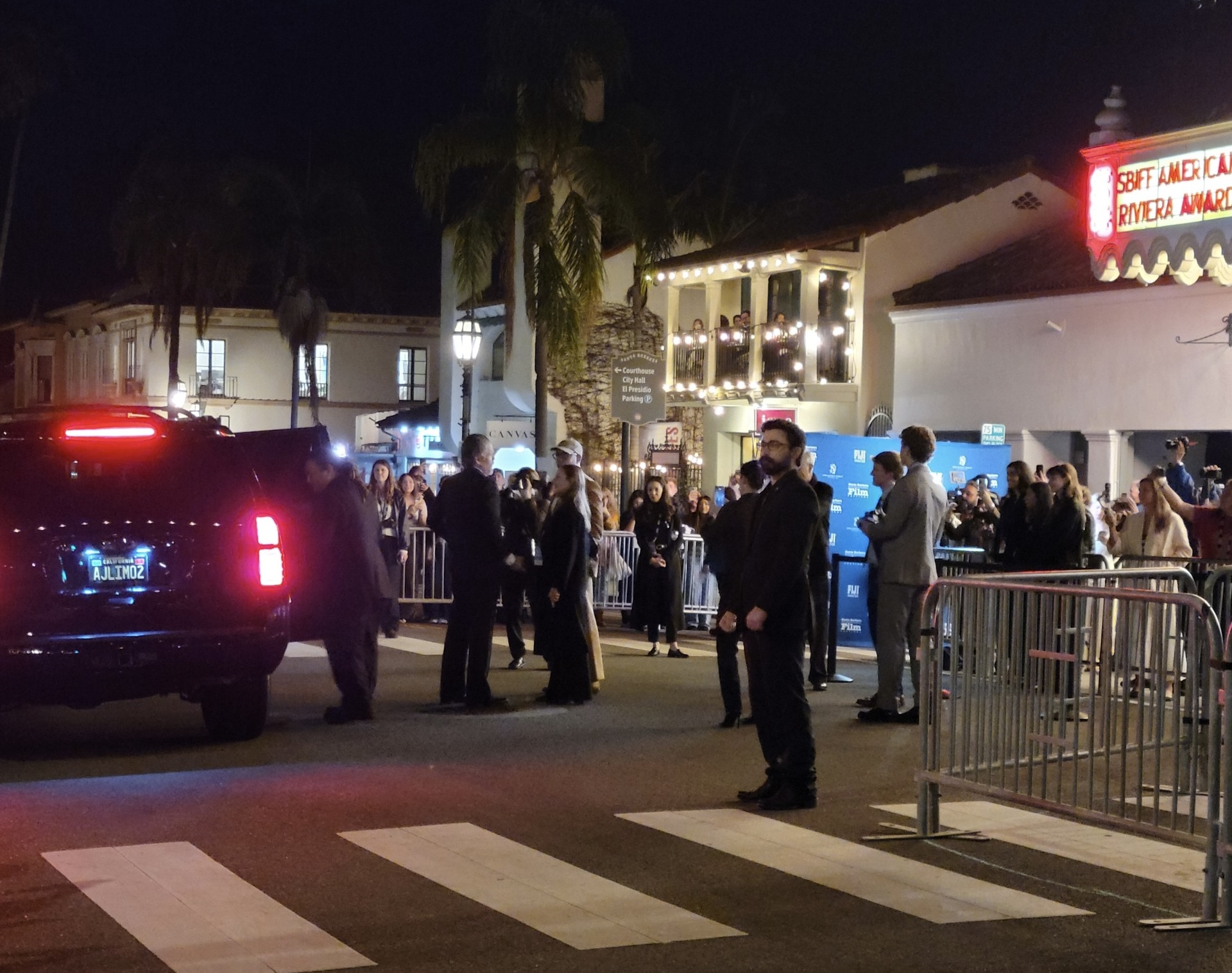
Ethan Hawke (second from left, foreground) arrives at SBIFF in 2026 to receive the American Riviera Award

Year	Recipients
2004	Diane Lane
2005	Kevin Bacon
2006	Philip Seymour Hoffman
2007	Forest Whitaker
2008	Tommy Lee Jones
2009	Mickey Rourke
2010	Sandra Bullock
2011	Annette Bening
2012	Martin Scorsese
2013	Quentin Tarantino
2014	Robert Redford
2015	Patricia Arquette and Ethan Hawke
2016	Michael Keaton, Rachel McAdams, and Mark Ruffalo
2017	Jeff Bridges
2018	Sam Rockwell
2019	Viggo Mortensen
2020	Renée Zellweger
2021	Delroy Lindo
2022	Kristen Stewart
2023	Brendan Fraser
2024	Mark Ruffalo
2025	Zoe Saldaña
2026	Ethan Hawke
2027	Anne Hathaway

=== Arlington Award ===
Inaugurated in 2024, it is named for the historic venue where all the fest’s annual tributes timed to Oscar season take place. The award honors "an artist who is greatly admired and who has demonstrated an incomparable commitment to film and its craft".

Year	Recipients
2024	Annette Bening
2025	Timothée Chalamet
2026	Kate Hudson

=== Hammond Cinema Vanguard Award ===
In 2026, the award was renamed as "Hammond Cinema Vanguard Award" after Pete Hammond and Madelyn Hammond, collaborators of the festival.

Year	Recipients
2008	Ryan Gosling
2009	Kristin Scott Thomas
2010	Vera Farmiga, Peter Sarsgaard, Stanley Tucci, and Christoph Waltz
2011	Nicole Kidman
2012	Jean Dujardin and Bérénice Bejo
2013	Amy Adams
2014	Martin Scorsese and Leonardo DiCaprio
2015	Eddie Redmayne and Felicity Jones
2016	Rooney Mara
2017	Casey Affleck and Michelle Williams
2018	Willem Dafoe
2019	Michael B. Jordan
2020	Laura Dern
2021	Carey Mulligan
2022	Benedict Cumberbatch
2023	Colin Farrell and Brendan Gleeson
2024	Paul Giamatti
2025	Adrien Brody and Guy Pearce
2026	Benicio del Toro, Leonardo DiCaprio, and Sean Penn

=== Kirk Douglas Award ===
The annual Kirk Douglas Award for Excellence in Film has been awarded since 2006 to a lifelong contributor to cinema through their work in film industry. The inaugural award of 2006 was awarded to Kirk Douglas himself.

Year	Recipients
2007 (Note: Year of the festival)	Kirk Douglas
2008	John Travolta
2009	Ed Harris
2010	Quentin Tarantino
2011	Harrison Ford
2012	Michael Douglas
2013	Robert De Niro
2014	Forest Whitaker
2015	Jessica Lange
2016	Jane Fonda
2017	Warren Beatty
2018	Judi Dench
2019	Hugh Jackman
2020	Martin Scorsese
2023	Michelle Yeoh
2024	Ryan Gosling
2025	Will Ferrell
2026	Cynthia Erivo
2027	Emily Blunt

=== Maltin Modern Master Award ===
The award, first named as Modern Master Award was established in 1995 to honor accomplishments of individuals in the motion picture industry for enriching culture. It was renamed the Maltin Modern Master Award in 2015 to recognize film critic, author and historian Leonard Maltin's long association with the festival.

Year	Recipients
1995	Michael Douglas
1997	Jodie Foster
2000	Anthony Hopkins
2001	Diane Keaton
2004	Peter Jackson
2006	George Clooney
2007	Will Smith
2008	Cate Blanchett
2009	Clint Eastwood
2010	James Cameron
2011	Christopher Nolan
2012	Christopher Plummer
2013	Ben Affleck
2014	Bruce Dern
2015	Michael Keaton
2016	Johnny Depp
2017	Denzel Washington
2018	Gary Oldman
2019	Glenn Close
2020	Brad Pitt
2021	Bill Murray
2022	Nicole Kidman and Javier Bardem
2023	Jamie Lee Curtis
2024	Robert Downey Jr.
2025	Angelina Jolie
2026	Adam Sandler
2027	Andrew Garfield

=== Montecito Award ===
Annette Bening was awarded the inaugural Montecito Award during the 20th annual festival on January 29, 2005.

Year	Recipients
2005	Annette Bening
2006	Naomi Watts
2007	Bill Condon
2008	Javier Bardem
2009	Kate Winslet
2010	Julianne Moore
2011	Geoffrey Rush
2013	Daniel Day-Lewis
2014	Oprah Winfrey
2015	Jennifer Aniston
2016	Sylvester Stallone
2017	Isabelle Huppert
2018	Saoirse Ronan
2019	Melissa McCarthy
2020	Lupita Nyong'o
2021	Amanda Seyfried
2022	Penélope Cruz
2023	Angela Bassett
2024	Jeffrey Wright
2025	Colman Domingo
2026	Stellan Skarsgård

=== Outstanding Directors of the Year ===
The award presented by The Hollywood Reporter, since 2009, is given to the year’s directorial trailblazers to celebrate their contributions to the film world.

Year	Director(s)	Work	Ref.
2018	Christopher Nolan	Dunkirk	
2018	Greta Gerwig	Lady Bird	
2018	Guillermo del Toro	The Shape of Water	
2018	Jordan Peele	Get Out	
2018	Paul Thomas Anderson	Phantom Thread	
2019	Alfonso Cuarón	Roma	
2019	Paweł Pawlikowski	Cold War	
2019	Yorgos Lanthimos	The Favourite	
2019	Adam McKay	Vice	
2019	Spike Lee	BlacKkKlansman	
2020	Bong Joon-ho	Parasite	
2021	Chloé Zhao	Nomadland	
2021	Thomas Vinterberg	Another Round	
2021	Lee Isaac Chung	Minari	
2021	David Fincher	Mank	
2022	Jane Campion	The Power of the Dog	
2022	Ryusuke Hamaguchi	Drive My Car	
2022	Steven Spielberg	West Side Story	
2022	Paul Thomas Anderson	Licorice Pizza	
2022	Kenneth Branagh	Belfast	
2023	Martin McDonagh	The Banshees of Inisherin	
2023	Todd Field	Tár	
2024	Justine Triet	Anatomy of a Fall	
2024	Martin Scorsese	Killers of the Flower Moon	
2025	Brady Corbet	The Brutalist	
2025	Coralie Fargeat	The Substance	
2025	Sean Baker	Anora	
2025	James Mangold	A Complete Unknown	
2025	Jacques Audiard	Emilia Pérez	
2026	Ryan Coogler	Sinners	
2026	Josh Safdie	Marty Supreme	
2026	Joachim Trier	Sentimental Value	
2026	Chloé Zhao	Hamnet	

=== Outstanding Performer(s) of the Year Award ===
Year	Recipients	Work
2004	Charlize Theron	The Italian Job and Monster
2005	Kate Winslet	Eternal Sunshine of the Spotless Mind and Finding Neverland
2006	Heath Ledger	Brokeback Mountain
2007	Helen Mirren	The Queen
2008	Angelina Jolie	A Mighty Heart
2009	Penélope Cruz	Elegy and Vicky Cristina Barcelona
2010	Colin Firth	A Single Man
2011	James Franco	127 Hours
2012	Viola Davis	The Help
2013	Jennifer Lawrence	Silver Linings Playbook and The Hunger Games
2014	Cate Blanchett	Blue Jasmine
2015	Steve Carell	Foxcatcher
2016	Brie Larson	Room
2016	Saoirse Ronan	Brooklyn
2017	Ryan Gosling	La La Land
2017	Emma Stone	La La Land
2018	Allison Janney	I, Tonya
2018	Margot Robbie	I, Tonya
2019	Rami Malek	Bohemian Rhapsody
2020	Adam Driver	Marriage Story
2020	Scarlett Johansson	Marriage Story
2021	Sacha Baron Cohen	Borat Subsequent Moviefilm and The Trial of the Chicago 7
2022	Will Smith	King Richard
2022	Aunjanue Ellis	King Richard
2023	Cate Blanchett	Tár
2024	Bradley Cooper	Maestro
2025	Ralph Fiennes	Conclave
2026	Michael B. Jordan	Sinners
2027	John Malkovich	Wild Horse Nine

=== Variety Artisans Award ===
The Award celebrates outstanding behind‑the‑scenes creators for their artistry and technical skills. The awards honor those who shape production design, costumes, editing, sound, or visual effects.

Year	Artisan(s)	Work	Area	Ref.
2015	Shawn Patterson	"Everything Is Awesome" (from The Lego Movie)	Song	
2015	Sandra Adair	Boyhood	Editing	
2015	Bill Corso and Kathrine Gordon	Foxcatcher	Hair & Makeup	
2015	Suzie Davies	Mr. Turner	Production Design	
2015	Dion Beebe	Into the Woods	Cinematography	
2015	Steven Noble	The Theory of Everything	Costume Design	
2015	Joe Letteri	Dawn of the Planet of the Apes	VFX	
2015	Richard King and Mark Weingarten	Interstellar	Sound Mixing & Editing	
2016	Carter Burwell	Carol	Original Score	
2016	Hank Corwin	The Big Short	Editing	
2016	Mark Mangini	Mad Max: Fury Road	Sound Editing	
2016	Arthur Max	The Martian	Production Design	
2016	John Seale	Mad Max: Fury Road	Cinematography	
2016	Patrick Tubach	Star Wars: The Force Awakens	Visual Effects	
2016	Diane Warren	"Til It Happens to You" (from The Hunting Ground)	Original Song	
2016	Jacqueline West	The Revenant	Costume Design	
2017	Alessandro Bertolazzi	Suicide Squad	Makeup and Hair	
2017	Jess Gonchor	Hail, Caesar!	Production Design	
2017	Justin Hurwitz	La La Land	Original Score	
2017	Justin Hurwitz, Benj Pasek & Justin Paul	"City of Stars" (from La La Land)	Original Song	
2017	James Laxton	Moonlight	Cinematographer	
2017	Robert Legato	The Jungle Book	Visual Effects	
2017	Alan Robert Murray	Sully	Sound Editing	
2017	Kevin O'Connell	Hacksaw Ridge	Sound Mixing	
2017	Joe Walker	Arrival	Editor	
2017	Mary Zophres	La La Land	Costume Design	
2018	Paul Denham Austerberry	The Shape of Water	Production Design	
2018	Mark Bridges	Phantom Thread	Costume Design	
2018	Alexandre Desplat	The Shape of Water	Original Score	
2018	Rachel Morrison	Mudbound	Cinematography	
2018	John Nelson	Blade Runner 2049	Visual Effects	
2018	Tatiana S. Riegel	I, Tonya	Editing	
2018	Julian Slater	Baby Driver	Sound Mixing	
2018	Arjen Tuiten	Wonder	Makeup and Hairstyling	
2018	Matthew Wood	Star Wars: The Last Jedi	Sound Editing	
2019	Barry Alexander Brown	BlacKkKlansman	Editing	
2019	Ruth E. Carter	Black Panther	Costume Design	
2019	Fiona Crombie	The Favourite	Production Design	
2019	Łukasz Żal	Cold War	Cinematography	
2019	Patricia Dehaney	Vice	Hair/Make-Up	
2019	Marc Shaiman	Mary Poppins Returns	Score	
2019	Skip Lievsay, Craig Henighan and José Antonio Garcia	Roma	Sound Mixing	
2019	Sergio Díaz and Skip Lievsay	Roma	Sound Editing	
2020	Kristen Anderson-Lopez and Robert Lopez	Frozen II	Songwriting	
2020	Michael Giacchino	Jojo Rabbit	Composing	
2020	Kazu Hiro	Bombshell	Makeup/Hairstyling	
2020	Barbara Ling	Once Upon a Time in Hollywood	Production Design	
2020	Steven A. Morrow	Ford v Ferrari	Sound Mixing	
2020	Christopher Peterson and Sandy Powell	The Irishman	Costume Design	
2020	Lawrence Sher	Joker	Cinematography	
2020	Lee Smith	1917	Editing	
2020	Adam Valdez	The Lion King	VFX	
2021	Alan Baumgarten	The Trial of the Chicago 7	Editing	
2021	Nicolas Becker	Sound of Metal	Sound	
2021	Alexandra Byrne	Emma	Costume Design	
2021	Sean Andrew Faden	Mulan	VFX	
2021	Donald Graham Burt and Jan Pascale	Mank	Production Design	
2021	Mia Neal	Ma Rainey's Black Bottom	Hair/Makeup	
2021	Leslie Odom, Jr. and Sam Ashworth	One Night in Miami...	Original Song	
2021	Trent Reznor and Atticus Ross	Mank and Soul	Original Score	
2021	Joshua James Richards	Nomadland	Cinematography	
2022	Frederic Aspiras and Göran Lundström	House of Gucci	Makeup and Hairstyling	
2022	Tamara Deverell	Nightmare Alley	Production Design	
2022	Germaine Franco	Encanto	Score	
2022	Greig Fraser	Dune	Cinematography	
2022	Lin-Manuel Miranda	Encanto	Song	
2022	Paul Massey	No Time to Die	Sound	
2022	Kelly Port	Spider-Man: No Way Home	Visual Effects	
2022	Peter Sciberras	The Power of the Dog	Editing	
2022	Jacqueline West and Bob Morgan	Dune	Costume Design	
2023	M. M. Keeravani	RRR	Songwriter	
2023	Frank Kruse	All Quiet on the Western Front	Sound Designer	
2023	Son Lux	Everything Everywhere All at Once	Composer	
2023	Catherine Martin	Elvis	Costume Designer	
2023	Florencia Martin	Babylon	Production Designer	
2023	Claudio Miranda	Top Gun: Maverick	Cinematography	
2023	Adrien Morot	The Whale	Hairstyling/Make Up	
2023	Paul Rogers	Everything Everywhere All at Once	Editing	
2023	Eric Saindon	Avatar: The Way of Water	VFX	
2024	Stephane Ceretti	Guardians of the Galaxy Vol. 3	VFX	
2024	Billie Eilish and Finneas O'Connell	Barbie	Songwriter	
2024	Ludwig Göransson	Oppenheimer	Composer	
2024	Sarah Greenwood and Katie Spencer	Barbie	Production Designer	
2024	Kazu Hiro	Maestro	Hairstyling/Makeup	
2024	Jennifer Lame	Oppenheimer	Editor	
2024	Rodrigo Prieto	Killers of the Flower Moon	Cinematography	
2024	Michael Semanick	Spider-Man: Across the Spider-Verse	Re-recording Mixer	
2024	Holly Waddington	Poor Things	Costume Designer	
2025	Judy Becker	The Brutalist	Production Design	
2025	Kris Bowers	The Wild Robot	Original Score	
2025	Clément Ducol and Camille	Emilia Pérez	Original Song	
2025	Nick Emerson	Conclave	Editing	
2025	Jomo Fray	Nickel Boys	Cinematography	
2025	Tod A. Maitland	A Complete Unknown	Sound	
2025	Pierre-Olivier Persin	The Substance	Hair/Makeup	
2025	Paul Tazewell	Wicked	Costume Design	
2025	Erik Winquist	Kingdom of the Planet of the Apes	VFX	
2026	Alexandre Desplat	Frankenstein	Original Score	
2026	EJAE	"Golden" (from KPop Demon Hunters)	Original Song	
2026	Jack Fisk	Marty Supreme	Production Design	
2026	Kate Hawley	Frankenstein	Costume Design	
2026	Mike Hill	Frankenstein	Makeup	
2026	Andy Jurgensen	One Battle After Another	Editing	
2026	Al Nelson	F1	Sound Editing	
2026	Adolpho Veloso	Train Dreams	Cinematography	
2026	Eric Saindon	Avatar: Fire and Ash	VFX	
2026	Chris Welcker	Sinners	Sound Mixing	

=== Virtuosos Award ===
The award was established to honor a select group of performers whose standout work in films has elevated them to the center of the national cinematic spotlight.

Year	Recipients	Work
2008	Casey Affleck	The Assassination of Jesse James by the Coward Robert Ford
2008	Marion Cotillard	La Vie En Rose
2008	James McAvoy	Atonement
2008	Elliot Page (Note: Credited as Ellen Page; Page came out as transgender and changed his name in 2020.)	Juno
2008	Amy Ryan	Gone Baby Gone
2009	Viola Davis	Doubt
2009	Rosemarie DeWitt	Rachel Getting Married
2009	Richard Jenkins	The Visitor
2009	Melissa Leo	The Wrestler
2009	Michael Shannon	Revolutionary Road
2010	Emily Blunt	The Young Victoria
2010	Carey Mulligan	An Education
2010	Saoirse Ronan	The Lovely Bones
2010	Gabourey Sidibe	Precious
2010	Michael Stuhlbarg	A Serious Man
2011	John Hawkes	Winter's Bone
2011	Lesley Manville	Another Year
2011	Hailee Steinfeld	True Grit
2011	Jacki Weaver	Animal Kingdom
2012	Demian Bichir	A Better Life
2012	Rooney Mara	The Girl with the Dragon Tattoo
2012	Shailene Woodley	The Descendants
2012	Andy Serkis	Rise of the Planet of the Apes
2012	Patton Oswalt	Young Adult
2013	Ann Dowd	Compliance
2013	Elle Fanning	Ginger & Rosa
2013	Ezra Miller	The Perks of Being a Wallflower
2013	Eddie Redmayne	Les Misérables
2013	Omar Sy	The Intouchables
2013	Quvenzhané Wallis	Beasts of the Southern Wild
2014	Michael B. Jordan	Fruitvale Station
2014	Brie Larson	Short Term 12
2014	Jared Leto	Dallas Buyers Club
2014	June Squibb	Nebraska
2015	Chadwick Boseman	Get on Up
2015	Ellar Coltrane	Boyhood
2015	Logan Lerman	Fury
2015	David Oyelowo	Selma
2015	Rosamund Pike	Gone Girl
2015	J.K. Simmons	Whiplash
2015	Jenny Slate	Obvious Child
2016	Elizabeth Banks	Love & Mercy
2016	Paul Dano	Love & Mercy
2016	Joel Edgerton	Black Mass
2016	O’Shea Jackson Jr.	Straight Outta Compton
2016	Géza Röhrig	Son of Saul
2016	Jacob Tremblay	Room
2016	Alicia Vikander	Ex Machina and The Danish Girl
2017	Aaron Taylor-Johnson	Nocturnal Animals
2017	Dev Patel	Lion
2017	Janelle Monáe	Moonlight
2017	Mahershala Ali	Moonlight
2017	Naomie Harris	Moonlight
2017	Ruth Negga	Loving
2017	Simon Helberg	Florence Foster Jenkins
2017	Stephen McKinley Henderson	Fences
2018	Daniel Kaluuya	Get Out
2018	Hong Chau	Downsizing
2018	John Boyega	Detroit
2018	Kumail Nanjiani	The Big Sick
2018	Mary J. Blige	Mudbound
2018	Timothée Chalamet	Call Me by Your Name
2019	Yalitza Aparicio	Roma
2019	Sam Elliott	A Star is Born
2019	Elsie Fisher	Eighth Grade
2019	Claire Foy	First Man
2019	Richard E. Grant	Can You Ever Forgive Me?
2019	Thomasin McKenzie	Leave No Trace
2019	John David Washington	BlacKkKlansman
2019	Steven Yeun	Burning
2020	Awkwafina	The Farewell
2020	Taron Egerton	Rocketman
2020	Cynthia Erivo	Harriet
2020	Beanie Feldstein	Booksmart
2020	Aldis Hodge	Clemency
2020	George MacKay	1917
2020	Florence Pugh	Midsommar
2020	Taylor Russell	Waves
2021	Riz Ahmed	Sound of Metal
2021	Maria Bakalova	Borat Subsequent Moviefilm
2021	Kingsley Ben-Adir	One Night in Miami...
2021	Andra Day	The United States vs. Billie Holiday
2021	Sidney Flanigan	Never Rarely Sometimes Always
2021	Vanessa Kirby	Pieces of a Woman
2021	Tahar Rahim	The Mauritanian
2021	Zendaya	Malcolm & Marie
2022	Caitriona Balfe	Belfast
2022	Ariana DeBose	West Side Story
2022	Alana Haim	Licorice Pizza
2022	Ciarán Hinds	Belfast
2022	Emilia Jones	CODA
2022	Troy Kotsur	CODA
2022	Simon Rex	Red Rocket
2022	Saniyya Sidney	King Richard
2023	Austin Butler	Elvis
2023	Kerry Condon	The Banshees of Inisherin
2023	Danielle Deadwyler	Till
2023	Nina Hoss	Tár
2023	Stephanie Hsu	Everything Everywhere All at Once
2023	Jeremy Pope	The Inspection
2023	Ke Huy Quan	Everything Everywhere All at Once
2023	Jeremy Strong	Armageddon Time
2024	Lily Gladstone	Killers of the Flower Moon
2024	Da'Vine Joy Randolph	The Holdovers
2024	Greta Lee	Past Lives
2024	Charles Melton	May December
2024	Danielle Brooks	The Color Purple
2024	Colman Domingo	Rustin
2024	America Ferrera	Barbie
2024	Andrew Scott	All of Us Strangers
2025	Monica Barbaro	A Complete Unknown
2025	Selena Gomez	Emilia Perez
2025	Ariana Grande	Wicked
2025	Clarence Maclin	Sing Sing
2025	Mikey Madison	Anora
2025	John Magaro	September 5
2025	Sebastian Stan	The Apprentice
2025	Fernanda Torres	I'm Still Here
2026	Jacob Elordi	Frankenstein
2026	Amy Madigan	Weapons
2026	Chase Infiniti	One Battle After Another
2026	Wagner Moura	The Secret Agent
2026	Renate Reinsve	Sentimental Value
2026	Sydney Sweeney	Christy
2026	Teyana Taylor	One Battle After Another
2026	Jeremy Allen White	Springsteen: Deliver Me from Nowhere
2027	Carrie Coon	The Liberation
2027	Mariana di Girolamo	Wild Horse Nine
2027	Rosalind Eleazar	Misty Green
2027	Jordan Firstman	Club Kid
2027	Anthony Ippolito	I Play Rocky
2027	Jaafar Jackson	Michael
2027	Inde Navarrette	Obsession
2027	Kate O'Flynn	Tender Loving Care
