= Roberto Bentivegna =

British-born Italian screenwriter

- Born: London, United Kingdom
- Education: Emerson College (BA); Columbia University (MFA)
- Occupation: screenwriter

Roberto Bentivegna is a British-born Italian screenwriter.

== Biography ==
Bentivegna was born in London to Sicilian parents and grew up in Milan. He graduated from Emerson College and received his MFA from Columbia University in 2010.

His screenplay The Eel was named to The Black List in 2012 and is currently under development, starring Sam Rockwell.

In 2022, he was nominated for a BAFTA Award for Outstanding British Film for his work on House of Gucci. He also adapted Jo Nesbø's novella "The Jealousy Man" into an Amazon feature entitled Killer Heat starring Joseph Gordon-Levitt, Richard Madden and Shailene Woodley which premiered in September 2024.

In January 2023, it was announced that Bentivegna was going to make his directorial debut with the adaptation of the novel The Sound of Things Falling in association with Alibi Media, while also writing the screenplay for it.
