= Barmy Aunt Boomerang =

Television series

- Starring: Toyah Willcox; Richard Madden
- Country of origin: United Kingdom
- Original language: English
- No. of seasons: 2
- No. of episodes: 30

Production
- Running time: 30 minutes

Original release
- Network: CBBC
- Release: 16 September 1999 – 21 December 2000

Barmy Aunt Boomerang is a children's comedy television series broadcast on BBC One in the United Kingdom from 16 September 1999 to 21 December 2000. Sebastian's world is turned upside down by the arrival of his unconventional Australian aunt Boomerang. It is revealed in the first episode that Aunt Boomerang is in fact a ghost who was starring in an Australian soap when she was killed on set. She now acts as something of a "fairy godmother" to Sebastian. The show ran for two series.

Alex Harvey (born October 1959), the son of the Scottish musician of the same name, played the part of police sergeant Keen.

== Series guide ==
- Series 1 - 15 episodes broadcast 16 September 1999 – 23 December 1999
- Series 2 - 15 episodes broadcast 14 September 2000 – 21 December 2000

(Source : BBC Motion Gallery)

== Cast ==
- Toyah Willcox as Aunt Boomerang
- Kern Falconer as Mr Diplock
- Terry Neason as Mrs Belcher
- Susy Kane as Ms Goodbody
- Laura McKenzie as Meryl
- Lawrie McNicol as Kevin Simpkins
- Richard Madden as Sebastian Simpkins
- Sharon MacKenzie as Tracey Simpkins
- Alex Harvey as Sergeant Keen
- Blaine Slater as Ashley

== Ratings (CBBC Channel) ==
Saturday 29 June 2002- 40,000 (2nd most watched on CBBC that week)
