= Michael K. O'Brien =

American visual effects artist

- Other name: Michael A. O'Brien
- Occupation: Visual effects artist
- Years active: 2001-present

Michael K. O'Brien is a visual effects artist who works at Pixar.

He won a 2016 Annie Award for Outstanding Achievement, Animated Effects in an Animated Production for his work on The Good Dinosaur. O'Brien won the award along with Jon Reisch, Stephen Marshall, Magnus Wrenninge and Michael Hall. He was also nominated for a 2012 Annie Award for his work on Brave.

He also won a Visual Effects Society Award.

== Selected filmography ==
- Coco (2017)
- The Good Dinosaur (2015)
- Brave (2012)
- Monsters, Inc. (2001)
