= Killer Heat =

2024 American film by Philippe Lacôte

- Promotional poster
- Directed by: Philippe Lacôte
- Screenplay by: Roberto Bentivegna; Matt Charman
- Based on: "The Jealousy Man" by Jo Nesbø
- Produced by: Brad Weston
- Starring: Joseph Gordon-Levitt; Shailene Woodley; Richard Madden
- Cinematography: Andrew Dunn
- Edited by: Jay Cassidy; Neil Smith
- Music by: Joseph Shirley
- Production companies: Amazon MGM Studios; Makeready; Faliro House
- Distributed by: Amazon Prime Video
- Release date: September 26, 2024
- Running time: 97 minutes
- Country: United States
- Language: English

Killer Heat is a 2024 American neo-noir mystery film directed by Philippe Lacôte, and written by Roberto Bentivegna and Matt Charman. Based on Jo Nesbø's short story "The Jealousy Man", the film stars Joseph Gordon-Levitt, Shailene Woodley, and Richard Madden. The film was released by Amazon Prime Video on September 26, 2024.

== Plot ==
Penelope Vardakis (Woodley) secretly hires private detective Nick Bali (Gordon-Levitt) to investigate the death of her husband Elias' (Madden) identical twin brother Leo (Madden) in Crete, Greece. Since the wealthy Vardakis family controls the island's police, she cannot get them to investigate the death, as officially it was a climbing accident. The family fears publicity could harm the value of their shipping company's stock. In a series of flashbacks, Nick is revealed to have abandoned his family following the breakdown of his marriage to his unfaithful wife, who became jealous over his work. Haunted by these memories, Nick drinks excessively to block them out.

Nick is allowed to see the coroner's documentation of Leo's injuries and is told that Georges Mensah (Ceesay) is in charge of the investigation. Nick visits Mensah, pretending interest in Leo's life insurance claim, but is rebuffed. Finding the Vardakis family yacht, Nick observes Elias leaving and follows him to a climbing spot at a cliff face, pretending to be an investigator from the Greek National Intelligence Service looking into Leo's death. Elias warns him to stay clear of his mother, Audrey (Holman). Nick convinces him to be interviewed over coffee.

To Nick's surprise, Elias insists he has not seen Leo for weeks. They had a major argument, and Elias explained that their father had encouraged them to fight and compete with each other from a young age. When Elias receives notice that Nick is not with the NIS, Elias abruptly leaves. Nick approaches Mensah, who he saw conducting surveillance on them, and offers to team up. They share information once he comes clean, admitting he is a former NYPD detective turned Athens P.I. Penelope contacts him, warning him about speaking to the family directly.

Penelope takes Nick to the cliff where Leo fell, and talks about meeting Leo and Elias. She says that she met Elias after Leo, as he started at Oxford a semester later. Elias tricked her into believing Leo was coming over to study but quickly talked her into a tryst. They started seeing each other regularly. She also says that she met their parents and saw how overshadowed Leo was. Penelope manages to get Nick proper clothes and an invitation to an exclusive political fundraiser hosted by the Vardakis family on their yacht. Approaching Audrey, he tries to get her to respond to allegations of foul play but is thrown off the boat and ordered to leave the island. Mensah later tells him he cannot have more contact with him.

Undeterred, Nick follows Elias the next day, but gets beaten up when an henchman of Elias spots him. Mensah helps him clean up. In the morning, Nick meets up with Penelope, who tells him that Elias, who is obsessed, will never let her leave him. He surprises her by asking about her affair with Leo, which he deduced when he found her hair tie at his place. Mensah and Nick determine which boat was used when Leo was killed and its location. In an exchange of gunfire, two of the presumed killers go down, but a bullet also gets Mensah. Racked with guilt, Nick goes over the details of the case. Realising that the broken fingers on Leo's corpse were likely caused by someone stomping on them rather than from the fall, he calls Penelope to send away their security, keep Elias there, and wait.

Once Nick has Penelope, Elias, and Audrey gather, he reveals that the twin present is Leo. He caused Elias to fall from the cliff by stomping on his hand. A furious Audrey, realizing he killed her adored Elias, shoots Leo dead. Nick is about to fly off when an idea comes to him. Returning to the Vardakis', Nick finds Penelope. She reveals that the plan had been for Leo to set her free, but he decided to take Elias' identity and also force her to stay. This is why Penelope hired Nick to expose Leo. She then convinces Nick to return home for his daughter, after which he calls her on his trip home.

== Cast ==
- Joseph Gordon-Levitt as Nick Bali
- Shailene Woodley as Penelope Vardakis
- Richard Madden as Leo and Elias Vardakis
- Clare Holman as Audrey
- Babou Ceesay as Georges Mensah
- Abbey Lee as Monique

== Production ==
The source material is Norwegian author Jo Nesbø's short story Sjalusimannen (English: The Jealousy Man), from his 2021 collection Sjalusimannen Og Andre Fortellinger (English: The Jealousy Man and Other Stories). The adapted screenplay was penned by Roberto Bentivegna with revisions by Matt Charman. Makeready's Brad Weston produced the film, with Faliro House serving as the local production entity. Joseph Gordon-Levitt executive produced alongside Nesbø, Niclas Salomonsson, Tom Karnowski and Makeready's Collin Creighton. Principal photography began in April 2023. Filming locations include the Greek island of Crete.

== Release ==
The film was released by Amazon Prime Video on September 26, 2024.

== Reception ==
On the review aggregator website Rotten Tomatoes, 19% of 27 critics' reviews are positive, with an average rating of 4.4/10. The website's consensus reads: "A modern noir utterly lacking in intrigue, Killer Heat is disappointingly lukewarm." Metacritic, which uses a weighted average, assigned the film a score of 33 out of 100, based on 4 critics, indicating "generally unfavorable" reviews.
