= Søren Steen Jespersen =

Danish director, producer and writer (born 1962)

- Born: 30 November 1962 (age 62); Copenhagen, Denmark
- Occupation(s): Director, producer and writer
- Years active: 2010–present

Søren Steen Jespersen is a Danish director, producer and writer best known for producing 2017 documentary Last Men in Aleppo, for which he was co-nominated for Academy Award for Best Documentary Feature.

Jespersen's team was unable to the 90th Academy Awards ceremony, as their visas were rejected in response to President Trump's Executive Order 13780.

== Filmography ==
Producer

2017: Last Men in Aleppo (Documentary) 2013: The Carbon Crooks (Documentary)

Director

2018: Lost Warrior (Documentary) 2015: Warriors from the North

Writer

- 2015: Warriors from the North (Documentary/story)

== Awards and nominations ==
- 90th Academy Awards - Academy Award for Best Documentary Feature
- 2017 Sundance Film Festival - World Documentary Grand Jury Prize
- Independent Spirit Award for Best Documentary Feature

== See also ==
- List of Nordic Academy Award winners and nominees
