= Evil Ed =

1997 film by Anders Jacobsson

- Film poster
- Directed by: Anders Jacobsson
- Screenplay by: Anders Jacobsson; Göran Lundström; Christer Ohlsson
- Produced by: Göran Lundström
- Starring: Johan Rudebeck; Per Löfberg; Olof Rhodin
- Cinematography: Anders Jacobsson
- Edited by: Anders Jacobsson
- Music by: Henriksson & Lindh
- Production company: Evil Ed Productions
- Release dates: 11 November 1995 (Stockholm International Film Festival); 4 May 1997 (Sweden)
- Running time: 93 minutes
- Country: Sweden
- Language: English

Evil Ed is a 1995 Swedish horror comedy film directed, co-written, edited and shot by Anders Jacobsson and starring Johan Rudebeck, Per Löfberg and Olof Rhodin. The film's plot follows the ordinary peaceful film editor Edward Tor Swenson, who is transferred to a movie company's horror department after the last employee went insane, and as he has to watch and edit gory movie scenes, Ed goes insane, and embark on a murder spree.

Evil Ed was originally titled The Censor and made over the course of three years. It premiered on November 11, 1995 at the Stockholm International Film Festival.

== Plot ==
When the original editor of the Loose Limbs series of splatter films commits suicide, the head of "The Splatter & Gore Department", Sam Campbell, assigns Edward Tor Swenson, an editor for European Distributors, to finish what the original editor was doing, and allows Edward the use of his private country cottage so Edward can go about his work in peace.

Over the course of a few days, having to watch and edit gory scenes every day, Edward begins to lose touch with sanity. One night, he dreams about a mental asylum patient telling him to kill others to "correct the world". When Nick, a young employee of European Distributors, pulls up to Edward's house to deliver developed film to be edited, he is rudely reprimanded by Edward. Edward begins to have hallucinations about demons, a gremlin in his refrigerator, and other creatures. When Sam comes to check up on Edward's work, Edward hallucinates that he is a white demon, and accidentally kills him by snapping his neck in a panic.

The next evening, Nick comes by Ed's cottage to deliver more developed film, but is attacked by Ed, and left in critical condition. After this, Edward kills two intruders who break into his house. Worried for her husband, Edward's wife, Barbara, and daughter go to visit him, but are almost killed by Edward, until Barbara shoots him in the shoulder with one of the intruders' revolver. He is taken to a psychiatric ward immediately after the attack, while Nick, who managed to crawl outside where he was noticed by a passing car, is taken to the same hospital.

In the mental ward, Edward is sedated by doctors, but he hallucinates that the attending doctors are demons and kills them. As he leaves the ward, he also kills a mental patient, which catches the attention of a security guard, who quickly calls a SWAT team. Edward assaults Nick in his hospital room, and abducts his girlfriend, Mel, who came to visit him.

Edward sedates Mel and props her on a hospital bed. Edward soon gets into a gun battle with the SWAT team, killing all of them, and gets into a stand off.

Edward kills Mel by impaling her with hospital equipment. As he's about to perform surgery on Mel, he hallucinates that Mel is the mental patient, who tells Edward that he has to pay for his terrible job of correcting the world. As he's about to stab Mel again, Nick shoots Edward's hand off with the SWAT Team Captain's shotgun. He shoots him again, blowing his arm off, and finally his head, killing him.

Nick walks up to Ed's dead body, and then to Mel's body, revealing that Edward had only hallucinated killing her. A voice over of Nick is heard telling the audience that one day the world will be a happy place, and "it will happen" eventually.

== Cast ==
Cast adapted from Arrow Video release.

- Johan Rudebeck as Eddie
- Olof Rhodin as Sam Campbell
- Per Löfberg as Nick
- Camela Leierth as Mel
- Dannie Malmer as Zip
- Mikael Kallaanvaara as Tom McCLane
- Göran Lundström as Bondage Face
- Kelly Tainton as White Demon
- Gert Fylking as SWAT lieutenant

== Production ==
Evil Ed was originally titled The Censor and made over the course of three years. Initially intending to make a grander film, the lack of money involved led to it being developed as a low-budget horror film. The film was shot in four-weeks on 16mm and finished shooting in late 1992. Evil Ed was filmed in Länna-ateljéerna, Jakobsberg and the former Roslagstull Hospital in Sweden in 1995. Anders Jacobsson began editing while Göran Lundström began work in the United States on horror films like Necronomicon (1993), Lurking Fear (1994) and Shrunken Heads (1994). Lundström returned to Sweden when the filmmakers decided they wanted add more material to their initial cut, adding the opening McClane scene, and a new final act at a hospital. The film was completed in 1995.

For a long time, there were rumors of a sequel. An unofficial title even circulated: 'Evil Ed 2: Ed Goes Bananas in the Bahamas.' Practical difficulties prevented a follow-up from being made, including the fact that the film was not a major commercial success and that the character Ed actually dies at the end. There was speculation about everything from a new slasher in the style of the first film to a zombie or vampire story. In an interview on 'Podden som Gud Glömde' with Johan Rudebeck (who plays Ed), it was discussed that there were ideas about Ed somehow returning, or his 'soul' or consciousness finding a new body, or even that Ed had a brother, ideas to get around the fact that the character died in the first movie.

== Release ==
Evil Ed premiered on November 11, 1995 at the Stockholm International Film Festival as part of the "Twilight Zone" genre section. It was released theatrically years later on May 4, 1997 in four theatres in Gothenburg, Stockholm and Uppsala.

The film was released direct-to-video by A-Pix in the United States in September 1996 in both an R-rated and unrated version. It was released on DVD by Image Entertainment in 1998.

The film was later released on Blu-ray by Arrow Video. This is the first time that the longer so-called "special Ed-ition" and deleted scenes from the film has been released.

== See also ==
- List of films featuring fictional films
