= Brad Weston =

American film producer

Brad Weston is an American film producer. From 2011 to 2016, he was the president and CEO of New Regency.

== Filmography ==
=== Producer ===
- Guinevere (1999)
- Track Down (2000)
- How to Kill Your Neighbor's Dog (2000)
- Prozac Nation (2001)
- Footloose (2011)
- One Chance (2013)
- A Million Little Pieces (2018)
- Queen & Slim (2019)
- Not Okay (2022)
- A Thousand and One (2023)
- Chang Can Dunk (2023)
- Killer Heat (2024)
- Opus (2025)
- Animals (2026)

=== Executive producer ===
- The 4th Floor (1999)
- Scary Movie 2 (2001)
- The Grey Zone (2001)
- My Boss's Daughter (2003)
- Scary Movie 3 (2003)
- Cursed (2005)
- Runner Runner (2013)
- Book Club: The Next Chapter (2023)

=== Co-executive producer ===
- Bad Santa (2003)

=== Associate producer ===
- Super Mario Bros. (1993)
