= Richard Madden =

Scottish actor (born 1986)

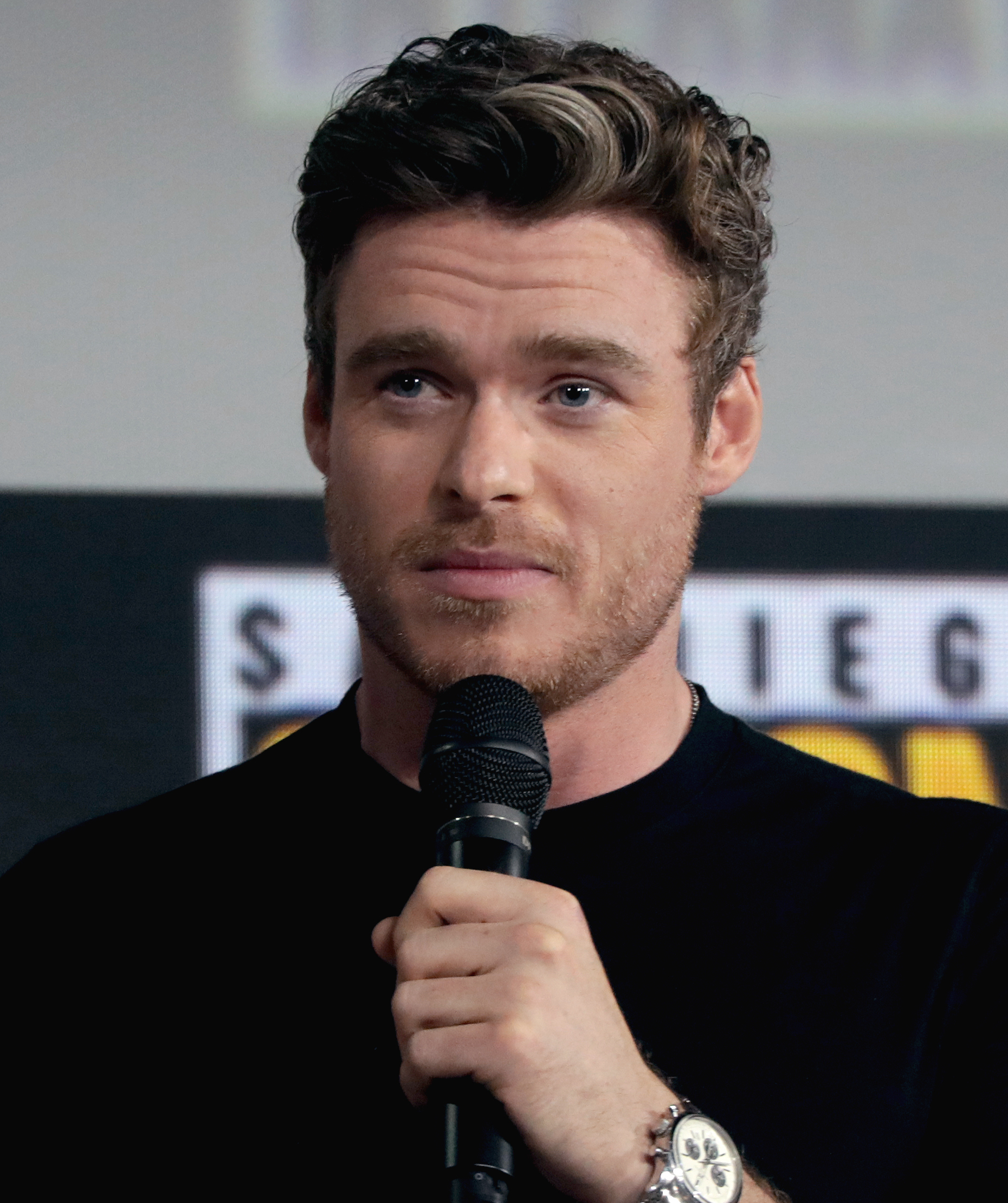
- Madden in 2019
- Born: 18 June 1986 (age 40); Elderslie, Renfrewshire, Scotland
- Education: Royal Conservatoire of Scotland
- Occupation: Actor
- Years active: 1997–present
- Partner: Jenna Coleman (2011–2015)

Richard Madden (born 18 June 1986) is a Scottish actor. He was cast in his first role at age 11 and made his screen acting debut in 2000. He later began performing on stage while a student at the Royal Conservatoire of Scotland. In 2007, he toured with Shakespeare's Globe company as Romeo in Romeo and Juliet, a role he reprised in the West End in 2016. Madden rose to fame with his portrayal of Robb Stark in the fantasy drama series Game of Thrones from 2011 to 2013.

Madden played Prince Kit in the romantic fantasy film Cinderella (2015) and Italian banker Cosimo de' Medici in the first season of the historical fiction series Medici (2016). In 2018, he gained acclaim for his performance as a police officer in the thriller series Bodyguard, for which he won a Golden Globe Award. The following year, Madden was named one of the 100 most influential people in the world by Time, and he had supporting roles as music manager John Reid in the biopic Rocketman and Lieutenant Blake in the war film 1917. He has since starred as Ikaris in the Marvel Cinematic Universe superhero film Eternals (2021) and as a spy in the action thriller series Citadel (2023–present).

== Early life and education ==
Madden was born on 18 June 1986 in Elderslie, outside the city of Glasgow, where he grew up alongside his two sisters. His mother is a primary school teacher, and his father worked as a firefighter. At age 11, Madden joined PACE Youth Theatre to help overcome his shyness. At that same age, he was cast in his first role as young Andy in a film adaptation of Iain Banks's Complicity, which was released in 2000. Next, he played the lead role of Sebastian in the children's television series Barmy Aunt Boomerang, which aired from 1999 until 2000. In addition to being shy, Madden struggled with body insecurities as a child. He later stated that he also experienced bullying, especially in high school, which he attributed to his role in Complicity.

Madden attended Castlehead High School. He studied at the Royal Conservatoire of Scotland, formerly the Royal Scottish Academy of Music and Drama, in Glasgow, graduating in 2007.

== Career ==
=== Beginnings ===
Madden worked with The Arches and the Glasgow Repertory Company during his studies; he also performed in Franz Xaver Kroetz's play Tom Fool at the Citizens Theatre. After receiving positive reviews, the Tom Fool production transferred to London, where Madden was spotted by a team from Shakespeare's Globe. In his final year at the conservatoire, he was cast as Romeo in the play Romeo and Juliet at the modern Globe Theatre in London, followed by a tour of the production during the summer of 2007. In her review, Susan Elkin of The Stage deemed the actor's portrayal of Romeo "gravelly Glaswegian" and "almost childlike".

That same year, Madden played Callum McGregor in the Royal Shakespeare Company's production of Malorie Blackman's Noughts & Crosses, which ran from December 2007 to February 2008. He then starred as Mark McNulty in the National Theatre of Scotland's production of the play Be Near Me in 2009, which The Times's Benedict Nightingale described as a "skilful adaptation" of the Andrew O'Hagan novel of the same name. Susan Mansfield of The Scotsman wrote that Madden had caught critics' attention, reporting additional positive reviews of his performances by The Daily Telegraph and The Observer. He later gained the lead role of Dean McKenzie in the 2009 BBC comedy-drama series Hope Springs, followed by his respective roles as Ripley and Theatre of Hate singer Kirk Brandon in the 2010 films Chatroom and Worried About the Boy.

=== 2011–2018: Breakthrough ===
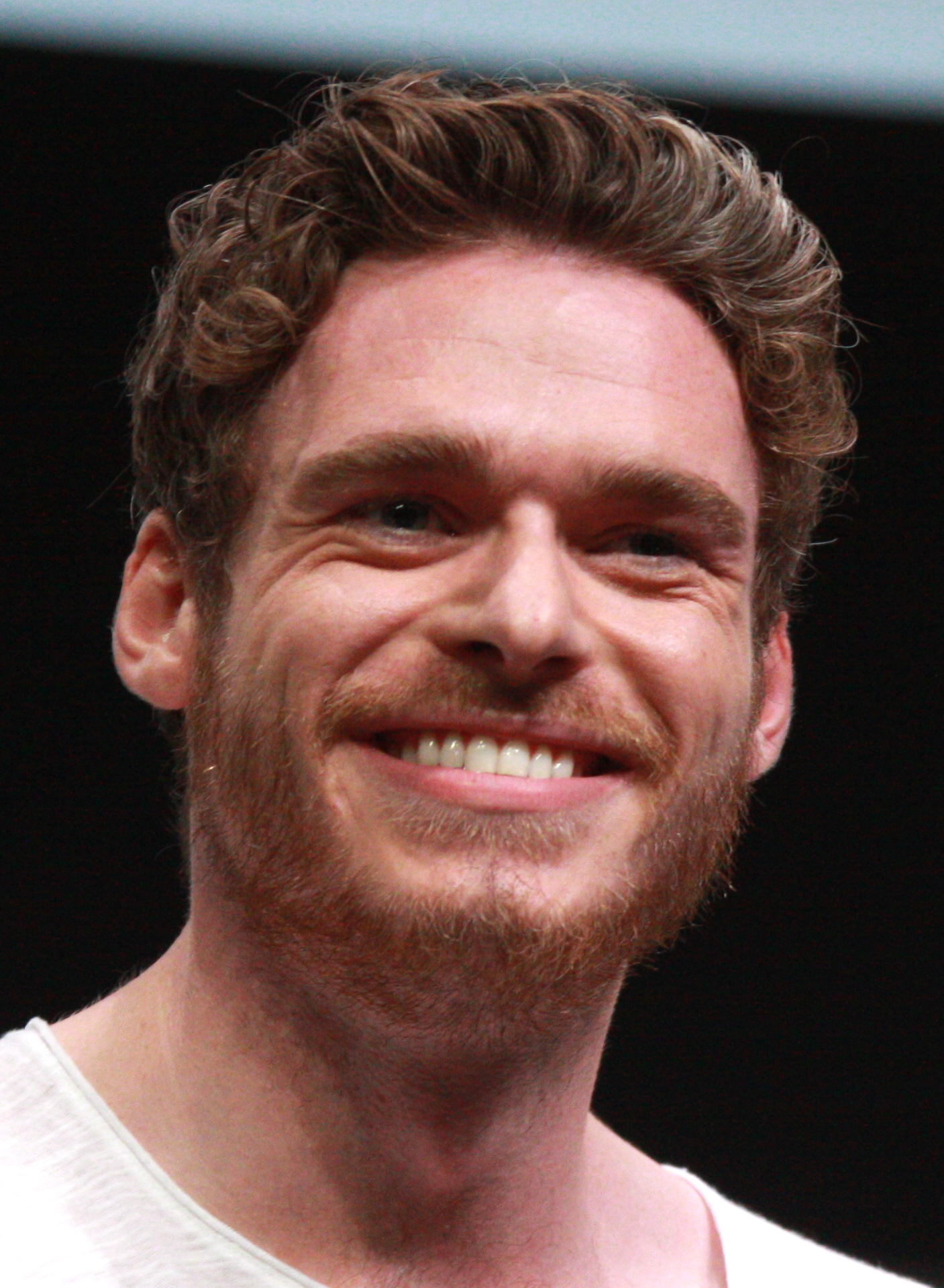
Madden at the 2013 San Diego Comic-Con

Madden starred as Robb Stark in the HBO fantasy drama series Game of Thrones, based upon the series of novels titled A Song of Ice and Fire by George R. R. Martin, from 2011 to 2013. His work as Stark propelled him to prominence. Madden later spoke about being broke and even contemplating moving back in with his parents prior to his casting. Throughout his time on the series, the ensemble cast garnered Screen Actors Guild Awards nominations for Outstanding Performance by an Ensemble in a Drama Series in 2011 and 2013. During this period, he also appeared in the Channel 4 comedy-drama series Sirens and the BBC drama series Birdsong. Madden first obtained his Screen Actors Guild (SAG) card for the 2014 miniseries Klondike, in which he played Bill Haskell, a real-life adventurer who participated in the Klondike Gold Rush.

Madden portrayed Prince Kit in Cinderella, a romantic fantasy film and live action adaptation of the animated film of the same name. While terrified of playing a classical fairy tale character, the actor found comfort in how audiences knew very little about the prince in the animated film and how he was able to create "a real young man." Released in March 2015, Cinderella was a critical and commercial success, grossing over $542 million. The following year, Madden starred as Romeo in a West End production of Romeo and Juliet, which opened at the Garrick Theatre on 25 May, reuniting with his Cinderella co-star Lily James, who starred as Juliet, and director Kenneth Branagh. Michael Billington of The Guardian praised Madden's articulation of Romeo's "challenge to fate", while Variety's Matt Trueman criticised his speeches as "flat and regimented". He departed the production in July after suffering an ankle injury.

In 2016, Madden appeared as an American pickpocket in the thriller film Bastille Day. He played the lead role of Cosimo de' Medici, a member of the House of Medici banking family during the Italian Renaissance, in the first season of the Italian-British television drama series Medici, subtitled Masters of Florence, which aired that same year. In 2017, he appeared in the first episode of Electric Dreams, an anthology series based on Philip K. Dick's works. Writing for Digital Spy, Alex Mullane found the actor "particularly dashing" and added that his performance made the twist in the story "brutally effective". Madden next played a DJ in the Netflix romantic comedy film Ibiza, embodying the part with hints of goofiness and loneliness. In her review for The Daily Telegraph, Lucy Jones deemed him a "fine and believable romantic lead."

Madden garnered acclaim and recognition for playing Sergeant David Budd, a war veteran and police officer with post-traumatic stress disorder (PTSD), in the 2018 BBC thriller series Bodyguard. He spoke to members of the armed forces who had experienced PTSD to frame a complex and intricate representation of the disorder. Tim Goodman of The Hollywood Reporter wrote that the actor executed the role with self-possession, while The Atlantic's Sophie Gilbert observed that he conveyed Budd's "superb instincts, his cool head under fire, and his complex psyche" successfully. After the series finale became the most watched UK television drama episode since the beginning of current records, Netflix released Bodyguard worldwide in October 2018. Madden's performance earned him the Golden Globe Award for Best Actor – Television Series Drama.

=== 2019–present: Film and television roles ===
In 2019, Madden portrayed music manager John Reid in the Elton John biopic Rocketman, which was released in May, and appeared as a World War I soldier in Sam Mendes' war film 1917, which was released in December. Both films garnered positive reviews and became box office successes. From December 2020 to January 2021, he starred in the science fiction podcast series From Now, voicing a survivor of a spaceship that returns 35 years after vanishing. Madden starred as Ikaris in the Marvel Cinematic Universe superhero film Eternals, directed by Chloé Zhao. Released in 2021, the film garnered mixed responses from critics and audiences.

Madden starred alongside Priyanka Chopra Jonas in Citadel, an action thriller series on Amazon Prime Video. It premiered in 2023. With a production budget of US$300 million, the six-episode first season ranks as one of the most expensive television shows. Madden considered working on Citadel to be "incredibly physically demanding". Critics had mixed opinions on the series; Daniel Fienberg of The Hollywood Reporter found Madden "adequately intense and sometimes funny in a way the insufficiently playful show needs". Madden next starred in Killer Heat (2024), a thriller film directed by Philippe Lacôte.

== Public image ==
In 2019, Madden was featured on the Time 100, an annual list of the 100 most influential people in the world compiled by Time magazine. He was also recognised with the GQ Men of the Year Award for Hugo Boss Most Stylish Man that same year. In July 2019, Madden received an honorary doctorate from his alma mater, the Royal Conservatoire of Scotland.

== Personal life ==
Madden was in a relationship with actress Jenna Coleman from 2011 to 2015. When asked about his personal life during a New York Times interview following tabloid speculation about his relationships and sexuality, Madden stated: "I just keep my personal life personal."

In an interview with British Vogue, Madden expressed pride in coming from a working class background and said that his social conscience is sparked by inequality in education and the lack of creative opportunities for working-class children in schools. As of May 2019, he splits his time between his residence in London and Los Angeles.

== Acting credits ==
=== Film ===
Year	Title	Role	Notes	Ref.
2000	Complicity	Young Andy		
2010	Chatroom	Ripley		
2011	Strays	Elliot	Short film	
2013	A Promise	Friedrich Zeitz		
2015	Cinderella	Prince Kit		
2015	Group B	Shane Hunter	Short film	
2016	Bastille Day	Michael Mason	Also known as The Take	
2018	Ibiza	Leo West		
2019	Rocketman	John Reid		
2019	1917	Lieutenant Joseph Blake		
2021	Eternals	Ikaris		
2024	Killer Heat	Leonides / Elias Vardakis		

=== Television ===
Year	Title	Role	Notes	Ref.
1999–2000	Barmy Aunt Boomerang	Sebastian Simpkins		
2002	Taggart	Christie	Episode: "Watertight"	
2009	Hope Springs	Dean McKenzie		
2010	Worried About the Boy	Kirk Brandon	Television film	
2011	Sirens	Ashley Greenwick	Main role	
2011–2013	Game of Thrones	Robb Stark		
2012	Birdsong	Captain Michael Weir		
2014	Klondike	Bill Haskell		
2015	Lady Chatterley's Lover	Oliver Mellors	Television film	
2016	Medici	Cosimo de' Medici	Also executive producer	
2017	Oasis	Peter Leigh	Pilot	
2017	Electric Dreams	Agent Ross	Anthology series Episode: "The Hood Maker"	
2018	Bodyguard	PS David Budd	Main role	
2023–present	Citadel	Mason Kane	Main role	
2026	Trinity	Webb Preston	Main role	
TBA	Trauma	Jim Marchant	Main role	

=== Theatre ===
Year	Title	Role	Notes	Ref.
2006–2007	Tom Fool	Clair Lizzimore	Citizens Theatre; Bush Theatre	
2007	Romeo and Juliet	Romeo Montague	Shakespeare's Globe	
2008	Noughts and Crosses	Callum McGregor	Royal Shakespeare Company	
2009	Be Near Me	Mark McNulty	Donmar Warehouse; National Theatre of Scotland	
2016	Romeo and Juliet	Romeo Montague	Garrick Theatre	

=== Other ===
Year	Title	Role	Notes	Ref.
2010	Of Mice and Men	Curley	Radio play; voice role	
2013	Castlevania: Lords of Shadow – Mirror of Fate	Trevor Belmont / Alucard	Video game; voice role	
2014	Castlevania: Lords of Shadow 2	Alucard	Video game; voice role	
2015–2016	Scotland's Home Movies	Narrator	Documentary; voice role	
2019	Harry Birrell Presents Films of Love and War	Narrator	Documentary; voice role	
2020–2021	From Now	Edward Fitz	Podcast series; voice role	

== Awards and nominations ==
Award	Year	Category	Nominated work	Result	Ref.
Screen Actors Guild Awards	2012	Outstanding Performance by an Ensemble in a Drama Series	Game of Thrones	Nominated	
Screen Actors Guild Awards	2014	Outstanding Performance by an Ensemble in a Drama Series	Game of Thrones	Nominated	
British Academy Scotland Awards	2019	Best Actor in Television	Bodyguard	Nominated	
Critics' Choice Television Awards	2019	Best Actor in a Drama Series	Bodyguard	Nominated	
Golden Globe Awards	2019	Best Actor – Television Series Drama	Bodyguard	Won	
Golden Nymph Awards	2019	Outstanding Actor	Bodyguard	Won	
National Television Awards	2019	Drama Performance	Bodyguard	Won	
Seoul International Drama Awards	2019	Best Actor	Bodyguard	Nominated	
