= Pamela Goldammer =

Swedish make-up artist

- Occupation: Make-up artist

Pamela Goldammer is a Swedish make-up artist. She was nominated for an Academy Award in the category Best Makeup and Hairstyling for the film Border.

== Selected filmography ==
- Border (2018; co-nominated with Göran Lundström)
- Little Girl Blue (2023)
