= Anna Carin Lock =

Swedish make-up artist

- Occupation: Make-up artist

Anna Carin Lock is a Swedish make-up artist. She was nominated for an Academy Award in the category Best Makeup and Hairstyling for the film House of Gucci.

== Selected filmography ==
- House of Gucci (2021; co-nominated with Göran Lundström and Frederic Aspiras)
