= Magnus Wrenninge =

Software developer

- Education: Linköping University
- Occupations: Software developer Visual effects artist
- Years active: 2004-present

Magnus Wrenninge is a Swedish software developer in the American film industry.

Magnus Wrenninge grew up in Sollentuna and studied after high school at Linköping University where he graduated in 2003. He then settled in the United States to work in the film industry in the country.

He won the Technical Achievement Award at the 2015 Academy Awards for leading the design and development of Field3D, and also as part of a team won a 2016 Annie Award for Outstanding Achievement, Animated Effects in an Animated Production for his work on The Good Dinosaur. Wrenninge won the award along with Jon Reisch, Stephen Marshall, Michael Hall, and Michael K. O'Brien. He also won a Visual Effects Society Award.

== Selected filmography ==
- The Good Dinosaur (2015)
