= House of Gucci =

2021 American film by Ridley Scott

- Theatrical release poster
- Directed by: Ridley Scott
- Screenplay by: Becky Johnston; Roberto Bentivegna
- Story by: Becky Johnston
- Based on: The House of Gucci: A Sensational Story of Murder, Madness, Glamour, and Greed by Sara Gay Forden
- Produced by: Ridley Scott; Giannina Facio Scott; Kevin J. Walsh; Mark Huffam
- Starring: Lady Gaga; Adam Driver; Jared Leto; Jeremy Irons; Jack Huston; Salma Hayek; Al Pacino
- Cinematography: Dariusz Wolski
- Edited by: Claire Simpson
- Music by: Harry Gregson-Williams
- Production companies: Metro-Goldwyn-Mayer Pictures; Bron Creative; Scott Free Productions
- Distributed by: United Artists Releasing
- Release dates: November 9, 2021 (Leicester Square); November 24, 2021 (United States)
- Running time: 158 minutes
- Country: United States
- Language: English
- Budget: $75 million
- Box office: $153.3 million

House of Gucci is a 2021 American biographical crime drama film directed by Ridley Scott, based on the 2001 book The House of Gucci: A Sensational Story of Murder, Madness, Glamour, and Greed by Sara Gay Forden.

The film follows Patrizia Reggiani (Lady Gaga) and Maurizio Gucci (Adam Driver) as their romance transforms into a fight for control of the Italian fashion brand Gucci. Jared Leto, Jeremy Irons, Jack Huston, Salma Hayek and Al Pacino also star.

Scott wanted to make a film about the Gucci dynasty after acquiring rights to Forden's book in the early 2000s. The project languished for several years, with several directors, and actors rumored to be considered before Scott and Gaga became officially attached in November 2019. Much of the remaining cast joined the following summer, and filming began in Italy, lasting from February through May 2021.

The world premiere of House of Gucci was held at the Odeon Luxe Leicester Square in London on November 9, 2021. It was theatrically released in the United States by United Artists Releasing on November 24, 2021. The film received mixed reviews from critics, who praised the cast's performances, but criticized the inconsistent tone and editing. Gaga and Leto were nominated for the Screen Actors Guild Award, Critics' Choice Award, and Satellite Award for Best Actress and Best Supporting Actor, respectively, while Gaga also received nominations for the Golden Globe Award and BAFTA Award. The film also earned a nomination at the 94th Academy Awards for Best Makeup and Hairstyling. It grossed more than $153 million against a $75 million budget.

== Plot ==
In Italy in 1978, Patrizia Reggiani is the office manager of her father's small trucking company. At a party, she meets Maurizio Gucci, a law student and heir to a 50% interest in the Gucci fashion house through his father Rodolfo. Patrizia aggressively pursues the awkward Maurizio, charming him into a romantic relationship.

Rodolfo warns Maurizio that Patrizia is only after his wealth, and tells Maurizio that he will disinherit him if he marries Patrizia. Maurizio chooses Patrizia over his connection to Gucci, leaving the family. Patrizia and Maurizio marry, and he is hired by her father's trucking company.

When Patrizia becomes pregnant, she considers her child to be an avenue for familial reconciliation, and lets that information slip to Maurizio's uncle Aldo, who is delighted and takes the couple under his wing.

Aldo introduces Patrizia to his eccentric son Paolo, who aspires to be a designer within Gucci despite his apparent lack of talent. Aldo helps Maurizio, and a terminally ill Rodolfo, reconcile shortly before the latter's death. Rodolfo returns Maurizio to his will, but, before he dies, fails to sign the document bequeathing to him the 50% interest in Gucci shares, so Patrizia forges Rodolfo's signature on Rodolfo's updated testament.

Patrizia devises a plot to obtain a controlling interest in Gucci by acquiring some of Aldo's and Paolo's shares (the other 50%). She clashes with Aldo over the firm's sale of cheap "fake" Gucci products on the black market, and consults Giuseppina "Pina", a psychic, for guidance on how to manipulate Maurizio, who has little interest in Gucci, into taking a more active role within the company.

Paolo acquires proof that Aldo has been evading taxes in the United States. He gives the information to Patrizia in exchange for her promise that he be allowed to design his own product line. Aldo is arrested by the IRS and sentenced to a year and a day in prison.

Patrizia lies to the Italian police and tells them that Paolo is not authorized to use the Gucci trademark, so they stop his fashion show by force. Patrizia and Maurizio ask Paolo to sell his shares to them, but he rebuffs their effort and cuts ties with them.

Italian police search Maurizio, attempting to arrest him for forging Rodolfo's signature. He flees to Switzerland, where Maurizio meets his old friend Paola Franchi. After an argument between Maurizio and Patrizia, he is tired of his wife's influence on him and the company. He orders his wife and daughter to return to Italy, and begins an affair with Paola, which Pina senses.

When Maurizio's business plans harm the company, he seeks assistance from investment firm Investcorp, through which he hatches a scheme to acquire shares of the company from a now-impoverished Paolo. Aldo returns from prison and immediately realizes what Paolo has done. When Investcorp offers to buy out Aldo, he refuses, until Maurizio reveals himself to be the deal's instigator. Dejected, Aldo sells the shares and cuts out communication with Maurizio.

Patrizia attempts a reconciliation with Maurizio, but he bluntly ignores her. He soon asks her for a divorce through his longtime assistant, Domenico De Sole, a request that she refuses. Maurizio recruits up-and-coming designer Tom Ford to revitalize the company's image through a new line. His products are successful, but Maurizio has so thoroughly mismanaged the company that, by 1995, Investcorp's leaders feel compelled to buy him out, replacing him with Tom and Domenico.

Patrizia eventually grows ever more furious with Maurizio. She asks Pina for help in assassinating him. Pina puts her in contact with two hitmen. A few days later, they shoot Maurizio to death in broad daylight outside his office.

Patrizia takes her husband's last name while announcing herself in court, indicating that she still considers herself to be a Gucci, even if the law does not.

Patrizia, Pina and the hitmen are sentenced to long prison terms following their arrests for murder. Aldo dies of prostate cancer in 1990, and Paolo dies in poverty shortly following the sale of his shares to Maurizio. Gucci is fully acquired by Investcorp, and continues to be successfully managed. Ultimately, no Gucci family members remain with the company.

== Cast ==
- Lady Gaga as Patrizia Martinelli-Reggiani
- Adam Driver as Maurizio Gucci
- Al Pacino as Aldo Gucci
- Jeremy Irons as Rodolfo Gucci
- Jared Leto as Paolo Gucci
- Jack Huston as Domenico De Sole
- Salma Hayek as Giuseppina "Pina" Auriemma
- Camille Cottin as Paola Franchi
- Reeve Carney as Tom Ford
- Alexia Murray as Silvana Reggiani
- Vincent Riotta as Fernando Reggiani
- Florence Andrews as Jenny Gucci
- Mia McGovern Zaini as Alessandra Gucci
- Mehdi Nebbou as Said
- Miloud Mourad Benamara as Omar
- Mădălina Diana Ghenea as Sophia Loren
- Youssef Kerkour as Nemir Kirdar
- Antonello Annunziata as Karl Lagerfeld
- Catherine Walker as Anna Wintour
- Martino Palmisano as Richard Avedon
- Gaetano Bruno as Franco

== Production ==
=== Development ===
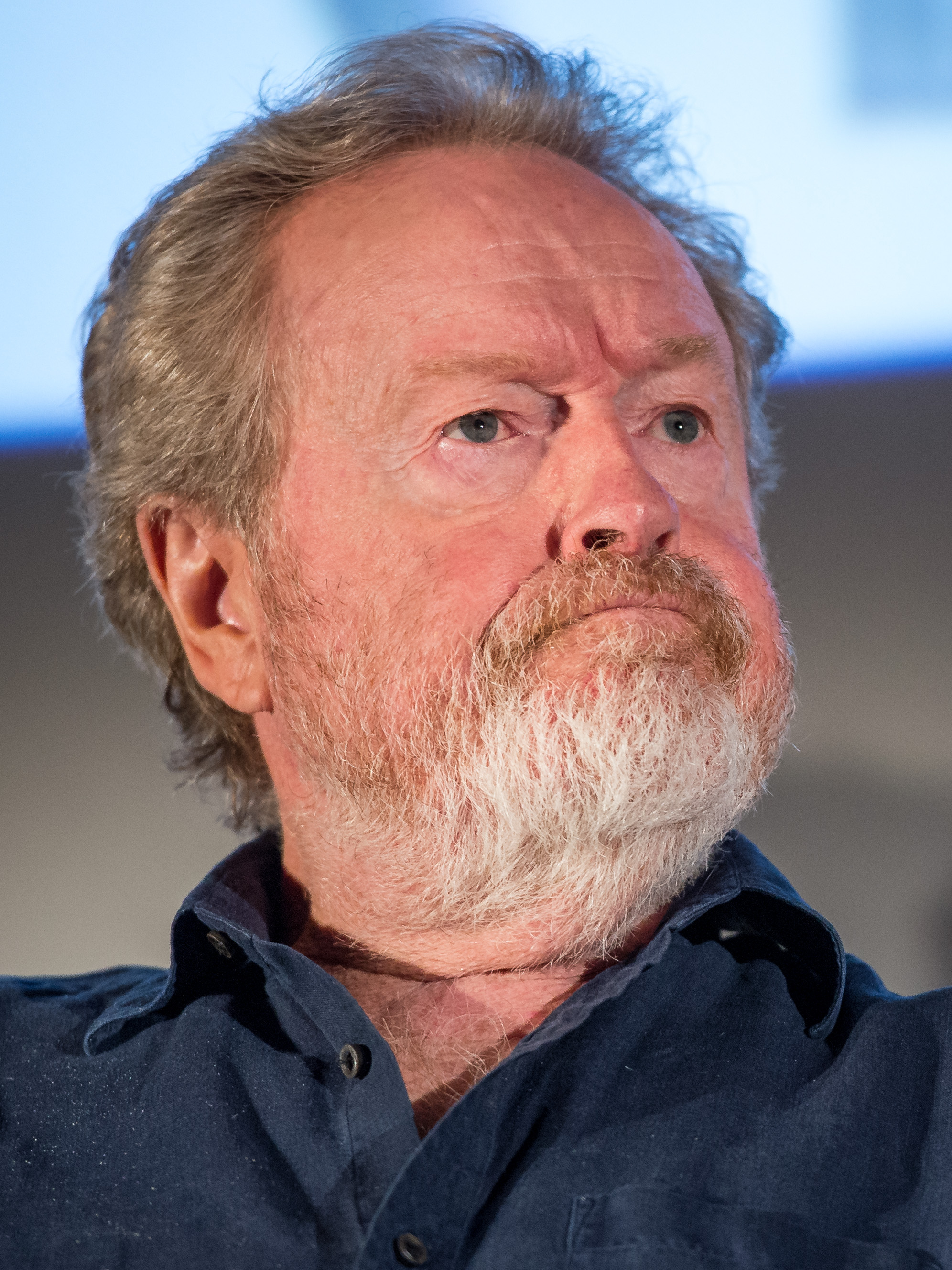
House of Gucci director Ridley Scott

In June 2006, Ridley Scott was set to direct a film for Paramount Pictures about the downfall of the Gucci family dynasty, with Andrea Berloff writing the script, despite the family's dismissal of the project, with Angelina Jolie and Leonardo DiCaprio rumored to play Patrizia Reggiani and Maurizio Gucci. In February 2012, Scott's daughter Jordan Scott had replaced him as director and was in talks with Penélope Cruz to play Reggiani. In November 2016, Wong Kar-wai took over as director from Jordan Scott, with Charles Randolph writing alongside Berloff, and Margot Robbie now being considered to play Reggiani. In November 2019, Ridley Scott was again set to direct the film, with Roberto Bentivegna writing the script, and Lady Gaga set to star. According to the Gucci CEO, Marco Bizzarri, the fashion house cooperated with the production and gave them full access to their archives for wardrobe and props.

Gaga explained that she took into account how her longtime friend Tony Bennett "feels about Italians being represented in film in terms of crime", and aspired to "make a real person out of Patrizia, not a caricature". To achieve that, she studied Reggiani's vocal cadence and attitude. She explained, "I felt the best way to honor Maurizio and Italians was for my performance to be authentic, from the perspective of a woman. Not an Italian-American woman, but an Italian woman." She stayed in character for 18 months, speaking with an accent for nine months during that period. She also ad-libbed many of her lines, including the film's iconic quote, "Father, son and House of Gucci", which went viral after the release of the film's first trailer.

=== Casting ===
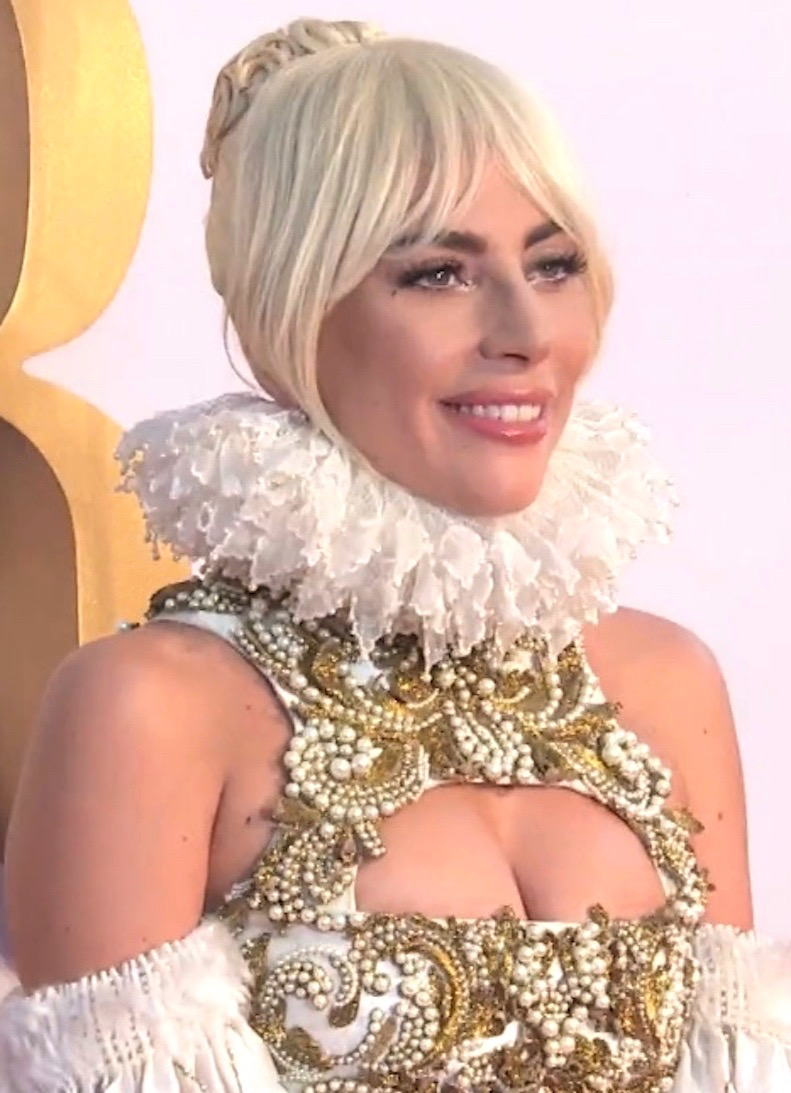
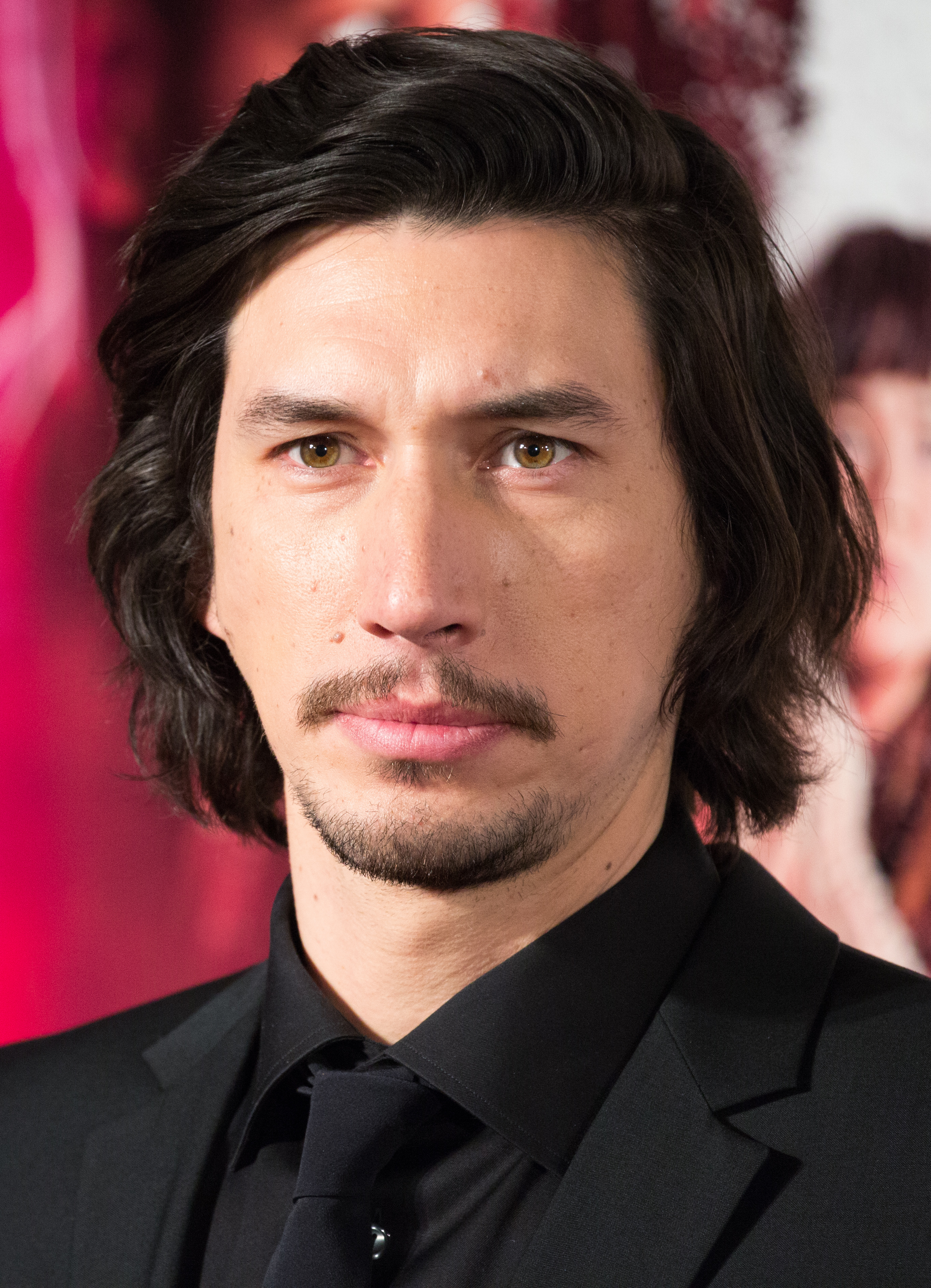
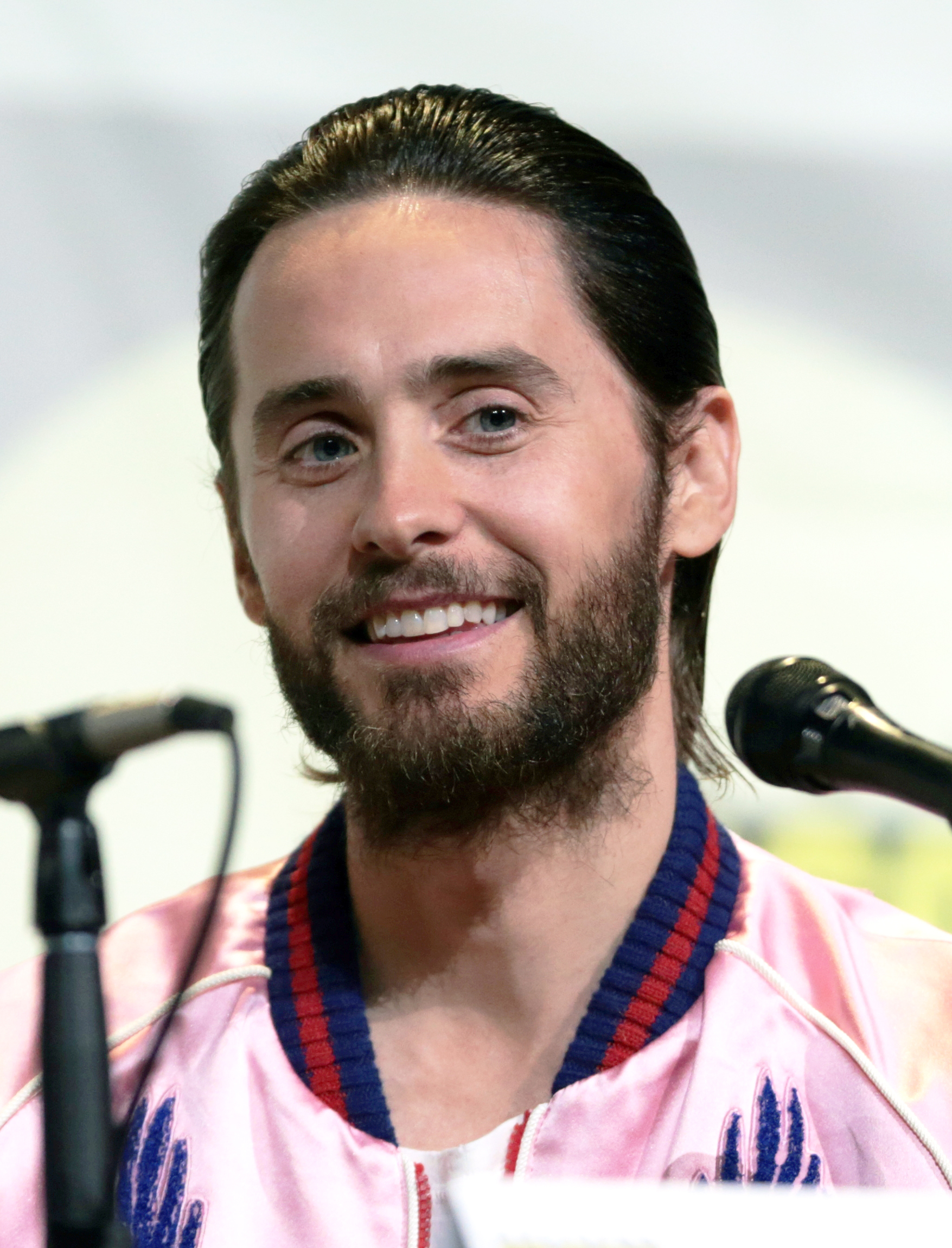
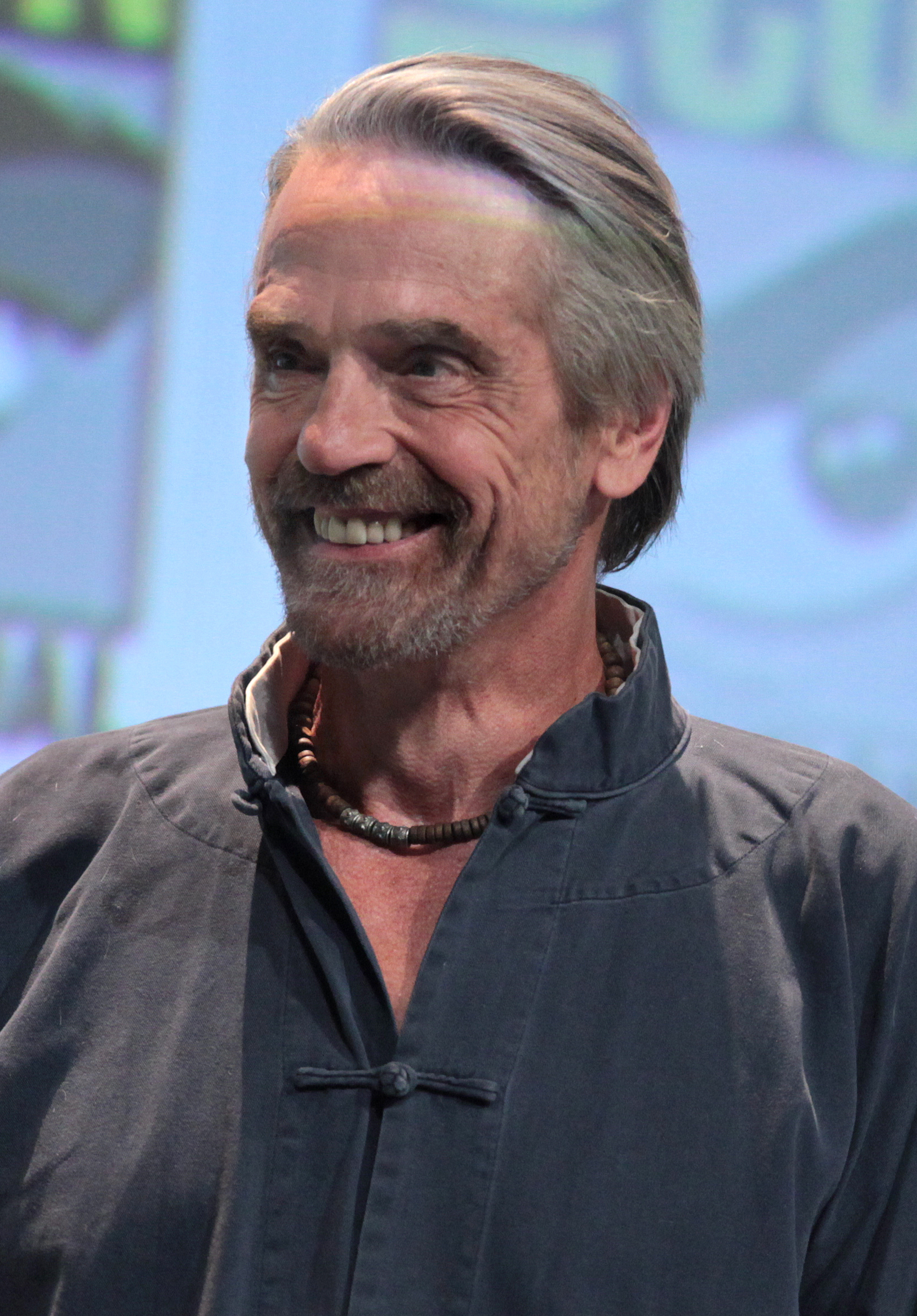
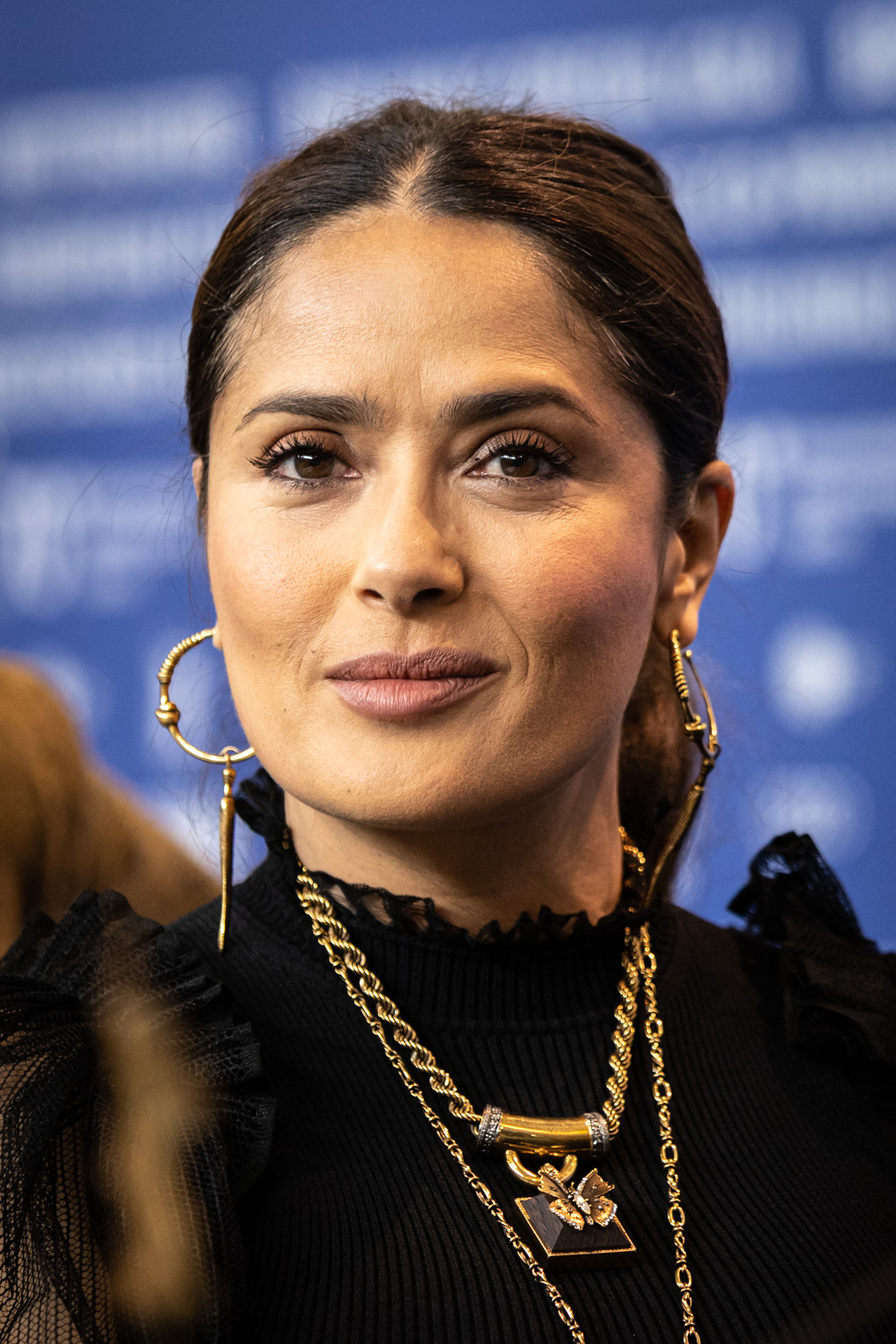
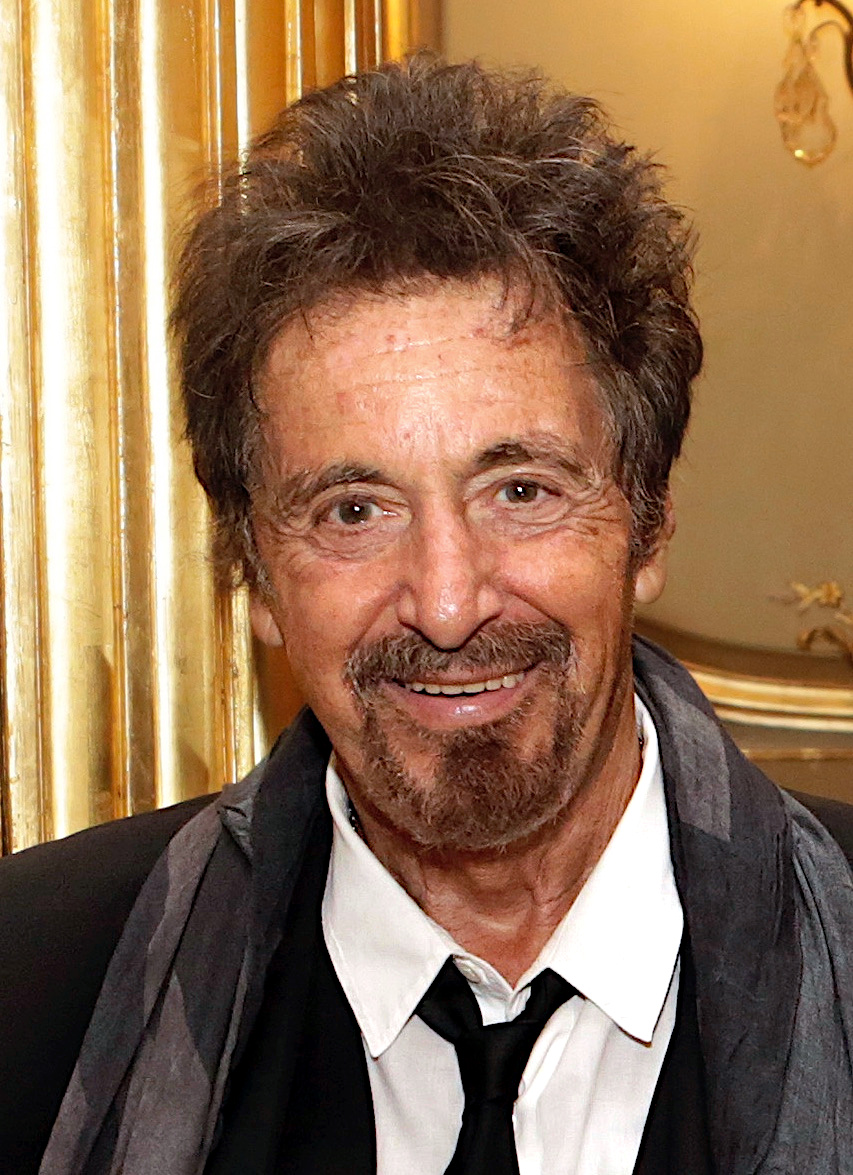
Top row: Lady Gaga, Adam Driver, Jared Leto
Bottom: Jeremy Irons, Salma Hayek, and Al Pacino

In November 2019, it was announced that Gaga would play Reggiani. In April 2020, Metro-Goldwyn-Mayer acquired the rights to the film. By August, Adam Driver, Jared Leto, Al Pacino, Robert De Niro, Jack Huston and Reeve Carney had entered into negotiations to join the cast. Driver, Leto, Pacino and De Niro were confirmed by October. Huston and Carney were confirmed in December, along with Jeremy Irons, while De Niro had exited the film. Dariusz Wolski announced his involvement as cinematographer that same month. Camille Cottin joined the cast in January 2021. In March, Mădălina Diana Ghenea, Mehdi Nebbou and Miloud Mourad Benamara were added to the cast, along with Salma Hayek, who was married to the CEO of Gucci's parent company, François-Henri Pinault.

=== Filming ===
In August 2020, it was reported that filming was expected to begin when Scott completed production of The Last Duel (2021). On February 3, 2021, Leto said that the film was still in the pre-production phase, and that they would start shooting in Italy in the coming weeks. Principal photography began in Rome at the end of February, with COVID-19 safety precautions in place.

Several scenes were filmed in early March in the cities of Gressoney-Saint-Jean and Gressoney-La-Trinité, specifically in the Italian Alps in the Aosta Valley, which were used to create the tourist complex of St. Moritz in Switzerland. Filming also took place in other locations, such as Florence, Lake Como (at Villa del Balbiano) and Milan, including the Villa Necchi Campiglio (previously featured in the film I Am Love). At the end of March, filming returned to Rome to shoot scenes at Via Condotti. Filming wrapped on May 8.

== Release and marketing ==
House of Gucci had its world premiere at the Odeon Luxe Leicester Square in London on November 9, 2021. It was released theatrically in North America on November 24, 2021, and in the United Kingdom on November 26. Following its theatrical release, it was available to stream on Paramount+. House of Gucci became available for wider streaming on February 1, 2022. It was released on Blu-ray and DVD on February 22.

United Artists Releasing aired the first trailer for the film during the 2021 Summer Olympics. Social media accounts promoting the film on Twitter, Instagram, YouTube, and Facebook had a total of 415.4 million followers, including 234 million followers from the cast.

Overall, the marketing campaign delivered at least 1.2 billion impressions and 407 million views online. Marketing tactics included radio, social and ticketing partnerships, television spots, and promotions on TikTok, Twitter and Snapchat. Crime podcasts were used to attract younger audiences. In theaters, trailers for the film ran during screenings of Respect, Free Guy, Dear Evan Hansen, No Time to Die, Halloween Kills, The Last Duel and Eternals. By November 25, United Artists Releasing had spent $12.8 million on television advertisements promoting the film.

== Reception ==
=== Box office ===
House of Gucci grossed $53.8 million in the United States and Canada, and $99.4 million in other territories, for a worldwide total of $153.2 million.

In the United States and Canada, House of Gucci was released alongside Encanto and Resident Evil: Welcome to Raccoon City, and was originally projected to gross $15-to-20 million from 3,441 theaters in its five-day opening weekend.

The film opened nationwide on Wednesday, November 24, 2021, and made $4.2 million on its first day—including $1.3 million from Tuesday night previews—from a total of 345,000 theater admissions. House of Gucci went on to debut to a $22 million five-day opening.

The main reasons given for seeing the film were Lady Gaga (40%), the ensemble cast (32%) and the plot (34%). 45% of audiences were between the ages of 18 and 34, and 34% over the age of 45, a higher-than-average result for a drama film targeting an older audience during the COVID-19 pandemic. According to Deadline Hollywood, House of Gucci had the best box-office opening for a drama film since Little Women in 2019, and Forbes predicted that the film would become "by far, the most 'successful' adult-skewing non-action drama of the so-called pandemic era".

The film made $7 million in its second weekend, $4.1 million in its third, $1.99 million in its fourth, and $915,339 in its fifth. In its seventh weekend, the film crossed the $50 million mark in the U.S. and Canada, while also finishing tenth at the box office with $616,744.

Outside the U.S. and Canada, the film earned $12.8 million from 40 markets in its opening weekend; the top countries in its first five days were the U.K. ($3.4 million), France ($1.9 million), Mexico ($975,000), Spain ($795,000), and the Netherlands ($629,000). The film went on to make $14.8 million in its second weekend and $10.1 million in its third. In its fourth weekend, House of Gucci grossed $4.1 million and crossed the $100 million mark worldwide. The film earned $3.16 million in its sixth weekend, $4 million in its seventh, $4.4 million in its eighth, and $2.8 million in its ninth.

=== Critical response ===
On the review aggregator website Rotten Tomatoes, 62% of 374 critics' reviews are positive, with an average rating of 6.2/10. The website's consensus reads: "House of Gucci vacillates between inspired camp and dour drama too often to pull off a confident runway strut, but Lady Gaga's note-perfect performance has a timeless style all its own." Metacritic, which uses a weighted average, assigned the film a score of 60 out of 100 based on 60 critics, indicating "mixed or average" reviews. Audiences polled by CinemaScore gave the film an average grade of "B+" on a scale of A+ to F, while those at PostTrak gave it an 82% positive score, with 60% saying that they would recommend it.

Deadline Hollywood noted a strong divide between critics and audiences, and said, "It appears moviegoers are overpowering."

Screen Rant commented that although the film received mixed reviews from critics, the performances of the cast were highly praised, with particular emphasis on Lady Gaga, Al Pacino, and Jared Leto.

Alissa Wilkinson of Vox gave the film a mixed review, praising the performances but criticizing the screenplay and writing. "The movie the trailer is selling is actually a little more dishy and wild than the real House of Gucci, which would be a pointless and somewhat perfunctory dud if it weren't for the brilliance, or madness, of the performances."

Reviewing the film for The Hollywood Reporter, David Rooney wrote, "Ridley Scott's film is a trashtacular watch that I wouldn't have missed for the world. But it fails to settle on a consistent tone — overlong and undisciplined as it careens between high drama and opera buffa."

Richard Roeper of the Chicago Sun-Times gave the film two-and-a-half stars out of four, writing, "Adam Driver (who has now played a French squire and an Italian fashion heir in consecutive Ridley Scott movies) and Lady Gaga have legit chemistry together, and it's still a kick to see Al Pacino roaring like a lion in winter. But Hayek and Irons are playing cardboard-thin characters, Leto flounders about as if he's in a movie all his own, and House of Gucci feels coldly calculating when it should have been flush and warm with scandalous sensationalism."

Writing for The New York Times, A. O. Scott found the film to be a missed opportunity that could have been crafted more in line with better cinematic standards, stating that it lacks "the necessary vision or inspiration".

Gaga's Italian accent was met with criticism by Italian actress and dialect coach Francesca De Martini, who worked on the set as a dialogue coach for Hayek, and claimed that Gaga's "accent is not exactly an Italian accent, it sounds more Russian".

BBC stated that Leto's portrayal of Paolo Gucci inspired "both ridicule and irritation". Film critic Mark Kermode described his performance as "parodic", writing that "while others adopt faintly ridiculous Italian inflections, Leto delivers his lines in a string of high-pitched whoops that suggest he is attempting to communicate with whales".

David Ehrlich of IndieWire described Leto as "brilliantly over-the-top".

Responding to negative reviews characterizing the cast's performances as "high-flown and jarringly incongruous", Michael Shindler of The American Conservative wrote that such comments overlook those performances' relation to the film's "dramatic substance", "a conflict of high-flown and jarringly incongruous personalities vying to remake Gucci in their own image", arguing that the film, like Scott's All the Money in the World, is a historical drama about the emergence of "a new man whose very character is adapted to the demands of contemporary commerce", comparing J. Paul Getty's role in the latter to that of Tom Ford.

=== Response from involved parties ===
In January 2021, during an interview with Italian magazine Novella 2000, the murderer Patrizia Reggiani approved that Gaga would portray her and commented that she "immensely" likes her, saying, "she's a genius". However, in March, Reggiani gave an interview to the Agenzia Nazionale Stampa Associata (ANSA), in which she stated that she was "annoyed" that Gaga had not contacted her to meet her, and claimed that "it is not an economic question. I won't get a cent from the film. It is a question of good sense and respect."

Later that month, it was confirmed that the producers did not want Gaga to meet her, and that they were "aware of not wanting to endorse or support the awful crime" that she committed, saying that Gaga had watched much footage and many documentaries, and read books about her life. Gaga also stated that she has no interest in "colluding" with Reggiani, but that her heart goes "out to her daughters... I do care deeply that this must be very painful for them".

Patrizia Gucci, who is Paolo Gucci's daughter and Maurizio Gucci's first cousin once removed, told the Associated Press, in the name of the Gucci family, that they were "truly disappointed" by the film. "They are stealing the identity of a family to make a profit, to increase the income of the Hollywood system." She added, "Our family has an identity, privacy. We can talk about everything, but there is a borderline that cannot be crossed."

According to Gucci, the three central concerns of the family are inaccuracies in the film, the lack of contact with Ridley Scott, and the casting of high-profile actors to play people who were not connected with the murder. She also said that the Gucci family will decide what their next course of action will be after watching the completed film. Scott rejected her claims, saying, "You have to remember that one Gucci was murdered and another went to jail for tax evasion so you can't be talking to me about making a profit. As soon as you do that you become part of the public domain."

Tom Ford, in an article for Air Mail, stated that he "felt as though [he] had lived through a hurricane when [he] left the theater", saying that, despite laughing on a few occasions, he found it "hard for [him] to see the humor and camp in something that was so bloody. In real life, none of it was camp. It was at times absurd, but ultimately it was tragic."

Ford praised most of the cast, although he did criticize Pacino's and Leto's performances, comparing them to Saturday Night Live performers, and adding on the latter, "Leto's brilliance as an actor is literally buried under latex prosthetics. Paolo, whom I met on several occasions, was indeed eccentric and did some wacky things, but his overall demeanor was certainly not like the crazed and seemingly mentally challenged character of Leto's performance." While not directly commenting on his role in the film nor Reeve Carney's portrayal of him, Ford noted that the moment of Maurizio's toasting of him was inaccurate, as he had already been bought out by the company before Ford became Gucci's creative director.

=== Accolades ===
Accolades received by House of Gucci
Award	Date of ceremony	Category	Recipient(s)	Result	Ref.
Detroit Film Critics Society	December 6, 2021	Best Supporting Actor	Jared Leto	Nominated	
Detroit Film Critics Society	December 6, 2021	Best Ensemble	House of Gucci	Nominated	
Washington D.C. Area Film Critics Association	December 6, 2021	Best Actress	Lady Gaga	Nominated	
St. Louis Film Critics Association	December 19, 2021	Best Actress	Lady Gaga	Nominated	
St. Louis Film Critics Association	December 19, 2021	Best Supporting Actor	Jared Leto	Nominated	
St. Louis Film Critics Association	December 19, 2021	Best Costume Design	Janty Yates	Nominated	
Dallas–Fort Worth Film Critics Association	December 20, 2021	Best Actress	Lady Gaga	4th place	
Florida Film Critics Circle	December 22, 2021	Best Actress	Lady Gaga	Nominated	
Florida Film Critics Circle	December 22, 2021	Best Supporting Actor	Jared Leto	Nominated	
Grindr Unwrapped Awards	December 22, 2021	Movie of the Year	House of Gucci	Won	
Capri Hollywood International Film Festival	January 3, 2022	Best Actress	Lady Gaga	Won	
Capri Hollywood International Film Festival	January 3, 2022	Capri Italian-American Artist of the Year	Lady Gaga	Won	
Palm Springs International Film Festival	January 6, 2022	Icon Award	Lady Gaga	Won	
Golden Globe Awards	January 9, 2022	Best Actress in a Motion Picture – Drama	Lady Gaga	Nominated	
San Diego Film Critics Society	January 10, 2022	Best Costumes	Janty Yates	Nominated	
Georgia Film Critics Association	January 14, 2022	Best Actress	Lady Gaga	Nominated	
Seattle Film Critics Society	January 17, 2022	Best Actress	Lady Gaga	Nominated	
Seattle Film Critics Society	January 17, 2022	Best Costume Design	Janty Yates	Nominated	
Alliance of Women Film Journalists	January 25, 2022	Best Actress	Lady Gaga	Nominated	
AACTA International Awards	January 26, 2022	Best Lead Actress	Lady Gaga	Nominated	
AACTA International Awards	January 26, 2022	Best Supporting Actor	Al Pacino	Nominated	
Golden Tomato Awards	January 31, 2022	Favorite Actor	Adam Driver	5th place	
Golden Tomato Awards	January 31, 2022	Favorite Actress	Lady Gaga	5th place	
Golden Tomato Awards	January 31, 2022	Favorite Actress	Salma Hayek	Nominated	
Paris Film Critics Association Awards	February 7, 2022	Best Actress	Lady Gaga	Nominated	
Make-Up Artists and Hair Stylists Guild Awards	February 19, 2022	Best Period and/or Character Make-Up in a Feature-Length Motion Picture	Jana Carboni, Sarah Tanno, Daniel Lawson Johnston and Stefania Pellegini	Nominated	
Make-Up Artists and Hair Stylists Guild Awards	February 19, 2022	Best Special Make-Up Effects in a Feature-Length Motion Picture	Göran Lundström and Federica Castelli	Nominated	
Make-Up Artists and Hair Stylists Guild Awards	February 19, 2022	Best Period and/or Character Hair Styling in a Feature-Length Motion Picture	Giuliano Mariano, Frederic Aspiras, Alexis Continente and Anna Carin Lock	Nominated	
Set Decorators Society of America Awards	February 22, 2022	Best Achievement in Décor/Design of a Period Feature Film	Letizia Santucci and Arthur Max	Nominated	
Screen Actors Guild Awards	February 27, 2022	Outstanding Performance by a Female Actor in a Leading Role	Lady Gaga	Nominated	
Screen Actors Guild Awards	February 27, 2022	Outstanding Performance by a Male Actor in a Supporting Role	Jared Leto	Nominated	
Screen Actors Guild Awards	February 27, 2022	Outstanding Performance by a Cast in a Motion Picture	Adam Driver, Lady Gaga, Salma Hayek, Jack Huston, Jeremy Irons, Jared Leto and Al Pacino	Nominated	
Hollywood Critics Association	February 28, 2022	Best Actress	Lady Gaga	Nominated	
Hollywood Critics Association	February 28, 2022	Best Costume Design	Janty Yates	Nominated	
Hollywood Critics Association	February 28, 2022	Best Hair & Makeup	Frederic Aspiras, Jana Carboni, Giuliano Mariano, Göran Lundström and Sarah Nicole Tanno	Nominated	
Queerties Awards	March 1, 2022	Studio Movie	House of Gucci	Runner-up	
Queerties Awards	March 1, 2022	Film Performance	Lady Gaga	Won	
African-American Film Critics Association	March 2, 2022	AAFCA's Top Ten Films	House of Gucci	Won	
American Cinematheque Tribute to the Crafts	March 7, 2022	Hair and Makeup	Jana Carboni, Giuliano Mariano, Göran Lundström, Sarah Tanno and Frederic Aspiras	Won	
Santa Barbara International Film Festival	March 7, 2022	Variety Artisans Award	Frederic Aspiras and Göran Lundström	Won	
Costume Designers Guild Awards	March 9, 2022	Excellence in Period Film	Janty Yates	Nominated	
British Academy Film Awards	March 13, 2022	Outstanding British Film	House of Gucci	Nominated	
British Academy Film Awards	March 13, 2022	Best Actress in a Leading Role	Lady Gaga	Nominated	
British Academy Film Awards	March 13, 2022	Best Makeup and Hair	Frederic Aspiras, Jana Carboni, Giuliano Mariano and Sarah Nicole Tanno	Nominated	
Critics' Choice Movie Awards	March 13, 2022	Best Actress	Lady Gaga	Nominated	
Critics' Choice Movie Awards	March 13, 2022	Best Supporting Actor	Jared Leto	Nominated	
Critics' Choice Movie Awards	March 13, 2022	Best Costume Design	Janty Yates	Nominated	
Critics' Choice Movie Awards	March 13, 2022	Best Hair and Makeup	House of Gucci	Nominated	
New York Film Critics Circle	March 16, 2022	Best Actress	Lady Gaga	Won	
Dorian Awards	March 17, 2022	Campiest Flick	House of Gucci	Won	
AARP Movies for Grownups Awards	March 18, 2022	Best Supporting Actor	Jared Leto	Won	
AARP Movies for Grownups Awards	March 18, 2022	Best Ensemble	House of Gucci	Nominated	
Golden Schmoes Awards	March 21, 2022	Best Actress of the Year	Lady Gaga	Won	
Golden Schmoes Awards	March 21, 2022	Coolest Character	Lady Gaga	Nominated	
Golden Schmoes Awards	March 21, 2022	Best Supporting Actor of the Year	Jared Leto	Nominated	
Golden Schmoes Awards	March 21, 2022	Best Trailer of the Year	House of Gucci	Nominated	
Golden Schmoes Awards	March 21, 2022	Best Line of the Year	"Father, son, House of Gucci"	Won	
Casting Society of America	March 23, 2022	Big Budget – Drama	Kate Rhodes-James	Nominated	
Golden Raspberry Awards	March 26, 2022	Worst Supporting Actor	Jared Leto	Won	
Golden Raspberry Awards	March 26, 2022	Worst Screen Combo	Jared Leto & Either His 17-Pound Latex Face, His Geeky Clothes or His Ridiculous Accent	Nominated	
Academy Awards	March 27, 2022	Best Makeup and Hairstyling	Göran Lundström, Anna Carin Lock and Frederic Aspiras	Nominated	
Satellite Awards	April 2, 2022	Best Actress in a Motion Picture – Drama	Lady Gaga	Nominated	
Satellite Awards	April 2, 2022	Best Supporting Actor – Motion Picture	Jared Leto	Nominated	
MTV Movie & TV Awards	June 5, 2022	Best Performance in a Movie	Lady Gaga	Nominated	
MTV Movie & TV Awards	June 5, 2022	Best Musical Moment	"Disco Forever"	Nominated	
Location Managers Guild Awards	August 27, 2022	Outstanding Locations in a Period Film	House of Gucci	Won	
Golden Trailer Awards	October 6, 2022	Best Drama	House of Gucci ("Legacy")	Nominated	
Golden Trailer Awards	October 6, 2022	Best Music	House of Gucci ("Legacy")	Nominated	
Golden Trailer Awards	October 6, 2022	Best BTS/EPK for a Feature Film (Under 2 Minutes)	House of Gucci ("House of Scott")	Nominated	
