= Göran Lundström =

Swedish make-up artist

- Occupation: Make-up artist

Göran Lundström is a Swedish make-up artist. He was nominated for two Academy Awards in the category Best Makeup and Hairstyling for the films Border (2018) and House of Gucci (2021).

== Selected filmography ==
- Evil Ed (1995) (also screenwriter)
- Lilja 4-ever (2002)
- The Wolfman (2010)
- Clash of the Titans (2010)
- Wither (2012)
- Hansel & Gretel: Witch Hunters (2013)
- Border (2018; co-nominated for an Academy Award with Pamela Goldammer)
- House of Gucci (2021; co-nominated for an Academy Award with Anna Carin Lock and Frederic Aspiras)
- The Batman (2022)
- The Last Voyage of the Demeter (2023)
