= Frederic Aspiras =

Vietnamese-Filipino-American wigmaker and hairstylist

- Occupations: Wigmaker, hairstylist

Frederic Aspiras is a Vietnamese-Filipino-American wigmaker and hairstylist. He was nominated for an Academy Award in the category Best Makeup and Hairstyling for the film House of Gucci.

== Selected filmography ==
- House of Gucci (2021; co-nominated with Göran Lundström and Anna Carin Lock)
- A Star Is Born (2018)
- American Horror Story: Hotel (2015–2016)
