= Dead Heat =

Dead Heat may refer to:

- Dead heat, in racing sports, an unresolvable tie

== Film and television ==
- Dead Heat (1988 film), an American comedy horror cop film
- Dead Heat (2002 film), an American crime comedy film
- "Dead Heat" (Murder, She Wrote), a 1985 television episode
- Dead Heat on a Merry-Go-Round, a 1966 American crime film

== Literature ==
- Dead Heat, a 1950 novel by Edward S. Aarons, writing as Paul Ayres
- Dead Heat, a 1963 novel by Richard S. Prather
- Dead Heat, a 1981 novel by Raymond Obstfeld
- Dead Heat, a 1984 Michael Spraggue novel by Linda Barnes
- Dead Heat (Stone novel), a 1996 novel by Del Stone Jr.
- Dead Heat, a 1999 Thoroughbred novel by Joanna Campbell and Alice Leonhardt
- Dead Heat, a 2003 novel by Caroline Carver
- Dead Heat, a 2005 novel by William Murray
- Dead Heat, a 2007 novel by Dick Francis and Felix Francis
- Dead Heat (Rosenberg novel), a 2008 Last Jihad novel by Joel C. Rosenberg
- Dead Heat, a 2011 novel by Kathleen Brooks
- Dead Heat, a 2011 novel by Sharon Green
- Dead Heat, a 2014 novel by Allison Brennan
- Dead Heat, a 2015 Alpha and Omega novel by Patricia Briggs
- Dead Heat, a 2016 novella by James Patterson and Lee Stone
- Dead Heat, a 2024 novel by Jessie Keane

== See also ==
- Heat death (disambiguation)
- List of dead heat horse races
- Photo finish
- Tie (draw)
