= Web of Lies =

Web of Lies or A Web of Lies may refer to:

== Music ==
- "Web of Lies", a song by Arch Enemy from Wages of Sin
- "Web of Lies", a song by Ayreon from 01011001
- "Web of Lies", a song by Corporate Avenger from Freedom Is a State of Mind
- "Web of Lies", a song by Mike + the Mechanics from Beggar on a Beach of Gold
- "A Web of Lies", a song by Michael DeLano

== Books ==
- Web of Lies, a novel by Beverley Naidoo
- Web of Lies, a book series by Kathleen Brooks
- Fox Investigates: A Web of Lies, a children's book by Adam Frost

== Television ==
- Web of Lies, a television show broadcast by Investigation Discovery
- "Web of Lies", a series of episodes from Outriders
- "Web of Lies", an episode of Bad Romance: A Special Edition of 20/20
- "Web of Lies", an episode of Blue Heelers
- "Web of Lies", an episode of Criminal Justice: Adhura Sach
- "Web of Lies", an episode of Dixon of Dock Green
- "Web of Lies", an episode of Fall
- "Web of Lies", an episode of The Ghost and Molly McGee
- "Web of Lies", an episode of K.C. Undercover
- "Web of Lies", an episode of Kehne Ko Humsafar Hain
- "Web of Lies", an episode of Knots Landing
- "Web of Lies", an episode of Marriage Boot Camp
- "Web of Lies", an episode of On the Case with Paula Zahn
- "Web of Lies", an episode of Point of Entry
- "Web of Lies", an episode of Scare Tactics
- "Web of Lies", an episode of The Streets of San Francisco
- "A Web of Lies", an episode of Mai
- "A Web of Lies: The Leigh Matthews Story", part of a docu-drama about the murder of Leigh Matthews
- Torchwood: Web of Lies, a companion series to Torchwood: Miracle Day
- "TheDailyBugle.net: EXCLUSIVE – Web of Lies!", an episode of The Daily Bugle

== Other uses ==
- "Web of Lies", an episode of the podcast The Europeans
