= The Amazing Spider-Man: Chance Encounter! =

The Amazing Spider-Man: Chance Encounter! is a graphic novel by Todd McFarlane published by Boxtree in 1996.

== Contents ==
The Amazing Spider-Man: Chance Encounter! is a graphic novel which collects two stories in which Spider-Man faces off against Morbius, the Living Vampire, in the story "Sub City" originally published in 1971, and against the wealthy supervillain Chance in the story "Chance Encounters" originally published in 1987.

== Reception ==
Dean Evans reviewed The Amazing Spider-Man: Chance Encounter! for Arcane magazine, rating it a 7 out of 10 overall. Evans comments that "The collection [...] is mainly notable as a showcase of McFarlane's early artistry, exhibiting the seeds of a visual style that catapulted the celebrated Spawn comic into the best-seller list. You can't help feeling that a measly two tales isn't much for your [money], so many of us are going to feel a bit ripped-off, but the hardcore fans out there certainly won't be disappointed with the quality of the stories."
