= Heat Death of the Universe =

Heat Death of the Universe or variants, may refer to:

- Heat death of the Universe, a theory that suggests the universe would evolve to a state of no thermodynamic free energy
- The Heat Death of the Universe, a 2003 album by Off Minor, and its title track
- "The Heat Death of the Universe", a 1967 short story by Pamela Zoline
  - The Heat Death of the Universe and other Stories, a 1988 anthology by Pamela Zoline
- "Heat Death of the Universe", a short story by Erin McKean and Carly Monardo, published in the 2010 anthology collection Machine of Death

== See also ==
- Heat death (disambiguation)
- Cold death (disambiguation)
