= Cold death =

Cold death may refer to:

== Death ==
- Heat death of the universe, the Big Freeze, where the universe dies in the cold
- Death by hypothermia
- Death by cold shock response
- death, in impersonal circumstances, in loneliness, by a stone cold killer without passion

== Other uses ==
- "A Cold Death" (episode), a 2019 TV episode of Primal (TV series)
- "Cold Death" (episode), a 1937 radio episode of The Shadow, see List of The Shadow episodes
- Brit: Cold Death (comic book), a 2003 volume of Brit (comics)
- "Cold Death" (novella), a 1955 short story by Barrington J. Bayley
- Cold Death (novel), a 1936 novel by Lawrence Donovan, see List of Doc Savage novels
- A Cold Death (novel), a 2015 Italian novel by Antonio Manzini translated by Anthony Shugaar nominated for the 2017 CWA International Dagger

== See also ==
- A Cold Night's Death, 1973 telefilm
- Frostbite which may cause gangrene and sepsis resulting in death
- Algor mortis, the cold of death
- Lonely death
- Heat death (disambiguation)
