= Morbius (film) =

2022 American film by Daniel Espinosa

- Theatrical release poster
- Directed by: Daniel Espinosa
- Written by: Matt Sazama; Burk Sharpless
- Based on: Marvel Comics
- Produced by: Avi Arad; Matt Tolmach; Lucas Foster
- Starring: Jared Leto; Matt Smith; Adria Arjona; Jared Harris; Al Madrigal; Tyrese Gibson
- Cinematography: Oliver Wood
- Edited by: Pietro Scalia
- Music by: Jon Ekstrand
- Production companies: Columbia Pictures; Marvel Entertainment; Arad Productions; Matt Tolmach Productions
- Distributed by: Sony Pictures Releasing
- Release dates: March 10, 2022 (Plaza Carso); April 1, 2022 (United States)
- Running time: 104 minutes
- Country: United States
- Language: English
- Budget: $75–83 million
- Box office: $167.5 million

Morbius is a 2022 American superhero film based on the Marvel Comics character. Produced by Columbia Pictures in association with Marvel Entertainment, Arad Productions, and Matt Tolmach Productions, and distributed by Sony Pictures Releasing, it is the third film in Sony's Spider-Man Universe (SSU). Jared Leto stars as Dr. Michael Morbius, alongside Matt Smith, Adria Arjona, Jared Harris, Al Madrigal, and Tyrese Gibson. The film was directed by Daniel Espinosa and written by Matt Sazama and Burk Sharpless. In the film, Michael Morbius and his surrogate brother Milo (Smith) become living vampires after curing themselves of a rare blood disease.

There were previously two notable attempts to adapt the character of Michael Morbius into a cinematic form since 1998, those being a role in the Blade franchise as an antagonist and having a solo film produced by Artisan Entertainment, neither of which ever came to fruition. After announcing plans for a new shared universe of films inspired by Spider-Man related characters beginning with Venom (2018), Sony began developing a film based on Morbius. Sazama and Sharpless had written a script by November 2017, and Leto and Espinosa officially joined in June 2018. Work on the film began at the end of the year with further casting, ahead of production starting in London in February 2019. Filming was confirmed to have been completed by June 2019, with reshoots happening in Los Angeles the following February. Jon Ekstrand was hired to compose the film's score.

Morbius premiered at the Plaza Carso in Mexico City on March 10, 2022, and was theatrically released in the United States on April 1, after being delayed several times from an initial July 2020 date, primarily due to the COVID-19 pandemic. Despite some praise for Smith's performance, critics panned Morbius for its writing, visual effects, and post-credits scenes. The film was also a box-office bomb, earning $167.5 million worldwide against a production budget of $75–83 million. It became the subject of Internet memes mocking its reception and quality; the popularity of said memes led Sony to re-release the film in theaters two months later on June 3, 2022, to another box-office bomb. It later received five Golden Raspberry Awards nominations, including Worst Picture, and ended up winning Worst Actor for Leto and Worst Supporting Actress for Arjona.

== Plot ==
At a hospital in Greece, 10-year-old Michael Morbius welcomes his surrogate brother Lucien, whom he renames Milo; they bond over their shared blood illness and desire to be "normal". Seeing Michael's potential, their adoptive father and hospital director Emil Nicholas arranges for Michael to attend medical school in New York while he focuses on caring for Milo.

25 years later, Michael publicly declines a Nobel Prize for his work with artificial blood. His colleague Martine Bancroft discovers he has secretly captured dozens of vampire bats from Costa Rica in the hope of splicing their genes with his own to cure his condition. Michael receives funding from Milo to outfit a private mercenary vessel in international waters with his equipment. While the cure works, it transforms Michael into a vampire who kills and drains the crew of their blood after they attack him out of fear. Once his bloodlust subsides and he regains his senses, a horrified Michael erases all CCTV footage of his experiment before contacting authorities and jumping overboard.

Michael returns to New York and discovers he now has superhuman strength, speed, and echolocation, with his vampire bats treating him as one of their own. To control his bloodlust, he subsists on his artificial blood as it gradually ceases to satisfy his needs. FBI agents Simon Stroud and Al Rodriguez investigate Michael's victims and deduce his involvement. Milo learns that Michael is cured but becomes furious when Michael refuses to cure him as well. While checking on a hospitalized Martine, Michael finds a dead nurse, drained of her blood. Believing he was responsible, he attempts to escape before being arrested by Stroud. In prison, he is visited by Milo and realizes Milo took his cure and killed the nurse. Michael escapes to confront him. An unrepentant Milo urges Michael to embrace his powers as he has. Unwilling to hurt his brother, Michael flees.

Michael meets Martine, acquires a new lab, and develops an antibody against vampirism to stop Milo; he also plans to use it on himself. Stroud and Rodriguez find footage of one of Milo's attacks and, believing Michael's vampirism to be spreading, release it to the media. Nicholas recognizes Milo and pleads with him to stop. Angered by Nicholas' perceived preference for Michael, Milo mortally wounds him; Michael arrives too late to save him while Milo also mortally wounds Martine. Martine dies in Michael's arms, forcing him to drink her blood. Michael summons an army of bats to restrain Milo and inject the antibody. Milo dies and Michael flies off with the bats, mourning his loved ones and embracing his identity as a vampire. Unbeknownst to him, Martine is resurrected, having ingested a drop of Michael's blood as he fed on her.

In two mid-credits scenes, Adrian Toomes is transported to Michael's universe from his own. (Note: Toomes is transported from the Marvel Cinematic Universe to Sony's Spider-Man Universe due to the events of the film Spider-Man: No Way Home (2021).) Surmising that Spider-Man is somehow responsible, Toomes approaches the fugitive Michael and suggests that they form a team. (Note: Identified off-screen as the Sinister Six)

== Cast ==
- Jared Leto as Dr. Michael Morbius:
  A scientist suffering from a rare blood disease whose attempts to cure himself afflict him with a form of transgenic vampirism, gaining all of the superhuman abilities but none of the superstitious weaknesses associated with vampires. Leto was drawn to the character's struggle with his disease and the moral implications of a hero who has a thirst for blood. He found the role surprisingly challenging since it was less character-driven than his prior performances and closer to his real-life personality, not requiring his well-known method acting approach. Charlie Shotwell portrays a young Michael.
- Matt Smith as Lucien / Milo Morbius:
  Michael's surrogate brother, a wealthy man originally named Lucien and nicknamed Milo by Michael (due to sharing a bed with many previous boys named Milo), who suffers from the same rare blood disease as he does. When Milo gains the same abilities as Michael, he embraces his identity as a vampire whole-heartedly. Smith was originally announced to play comic book character Loxias Crown / Hunger, but this was later changed to a significantly different character based on Michael himself. After turning down other superhero film roles, Smith joined the film due to Daniel Espinosa's involvement and encouragement from his former Doctor Who castmate Karen Gillan, who portrays Nebula in the Marvel Cinematic Universe (MCU). Espinosa encouraged Smith to give a bold, villainous performance. Joseph Esson portrays a young Milo.
- Adria Arjona as Dr. Martine Bancroft: A scientist and Michael's colleague. Arjona said the character was "the smart one in the room" and took inspiration from politician and activist Alexandria Ocasio-Cortez.
- Jared Harris as Dr. Emil Nicholas: A mentor and father figure for Michael and Milo who runs a facility that looks after people with incurable illnesses.
- Al Madrigal as Al Rodriguez: An FBI agent hunting Michael, and Stroud's partner.
- Tyrese Gibson as Simon Stroud:
  An FBI agent hunting Michael, and Rodriguez's partner. Gibson noted that the character is white in the comic books, and the producers "made him black" to cast Gibson. While Gibson described Stroud as a "superhero" with a "hi-tech weapons-grade arm" in the film, all scenes featuring this arm were cut. Gibson signed a three-picture deal when he joined the film.

Corey Johnson portrays mercenary Mr. Fox, while Michael Keaton makes a cameo appearance in the mid-credits scenes as Adrian Toomes / Vulture, reprising his role from the MCU film Spider-Man: Homecoming (2017). J. K. Simmons filmed a cameo reprising his role as J. Jonah Jameson, but his scenes were cut.

== Production ==
=== Development ===
Artisan Entertainment announced a deal with Marvel Entertainment in May 2000 to co-produce, finance, and distribute several films based on Marvel Comics characters, including Morbius, the Living Vampire. Previously, the character was set to appear in Blade (1998), portrayed by director Stephen Norrington in a cameo appearance ahead of a larger role in a sequel. However, the character was cut from the first film and not introduced in Blade II (2002) after Norrington chose not to return for that film. In May 2017, Sony announced plans for a new shared universe featuring Spider-Man-related properties beginning with Venom in October 2018; this was later titled "Sony's Spider-Man Universe". In July, Spider-Man: Homecoming (2017) director Jon Watts expressed interest in featuring Morbius and Blade in the then untitled Spider-Man: Far From Home (2019), believing that the character's dark tone could work well within the Marvel Cinematic Universe (MCU). That November, Matt Sazama and Burk Sharpless submitted a script to Sony for a Morbius film, after a "secret development process" at the studio. Jared Leto became "loosely attached" to star in the title role, but would not commit to the film until he was happy with its direction; Leto asked to personally meet with several director candidates.

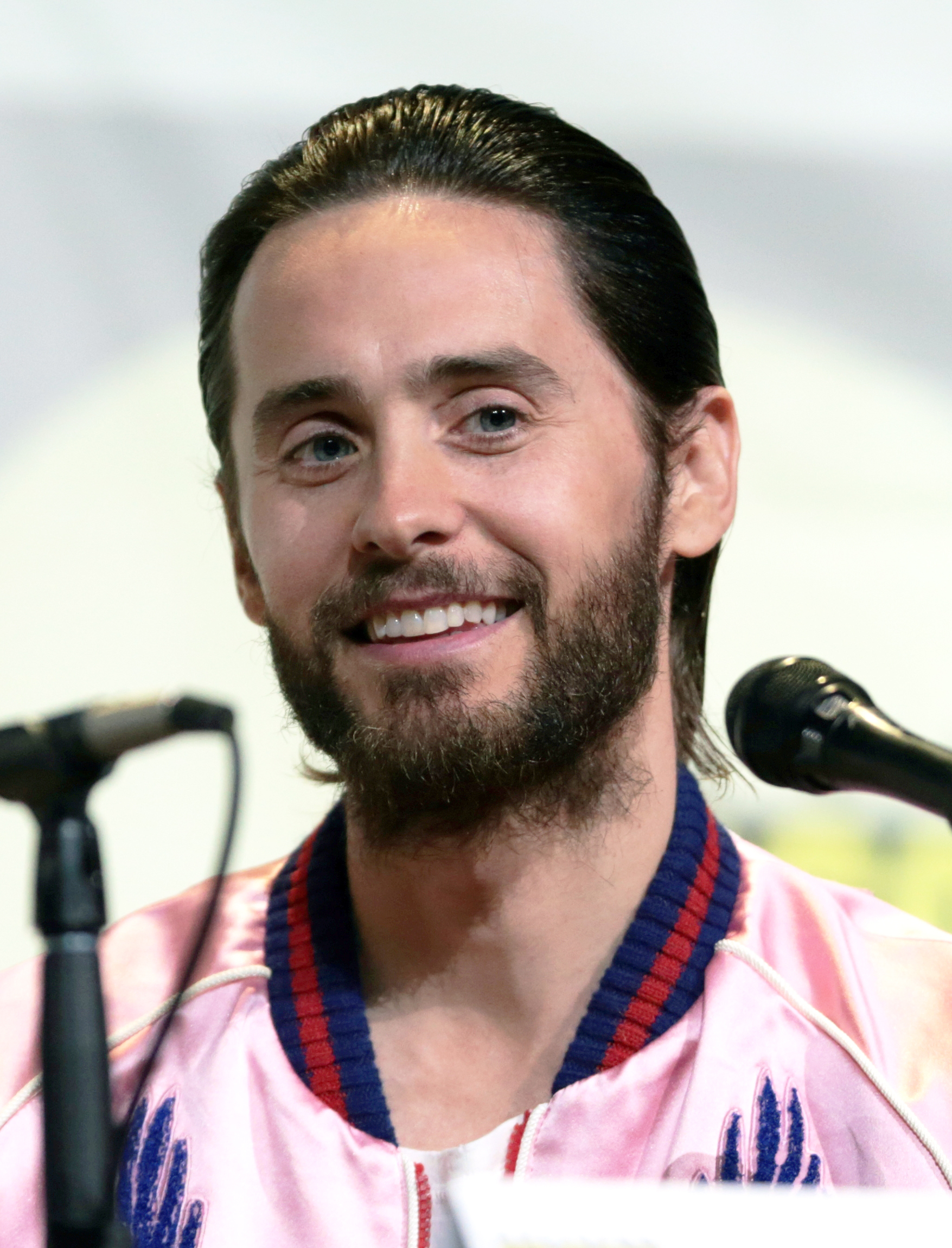
Jared Leto stars in the role of Morbius. Director Daniel Espinosa joined the film after meeting with Leto while he was on tour with his band Thirty Seconds to Mars.

By the end of April 2018, Sony had approached Antoine Fuqua about potentially directing the film. He expressed interest in taking on the project, and said that if he was to make a film in the superhero genre he would want to make it "something that's closer to what I get excited about." He ultimately chose not to take on the project. Other directors that Sony approached about the film included F. Gary Gray, who considered directing the film but ultimately turned down the role, and Daniel Espinosa, who previously directed the film Life (2017) for the studio. In May, while on tour in Germany with his band Thirty Seconds to Mars, Leto met with Espinosa to talk about the film, and the pair were both confirmed for the project at the end of June. Avi Arad, Matt Tolmach, and Lucas Foster were producing, and filming was expected to begin by the end of 2018. Sony was expected to fit the film into its already-set Marvel release slate shortly.

=== Pre-production ===
By the end of September, Sony was intending for production on the film to take place in Atlanta, Georgia—where Spider-Man: Homecoming and Venom were previously produced—but had still not set a release date for the film. Screen Rant's Cooper Hood opined that Sony was likely waiting to see the response to Venom in early October, with Arad confirming at that time that there was excitement at Sony to produce Morbius, especially due to the story of a "healer that becomes a killer, and how do you deal with [that?]" Tolmach said the project was "very far along" at that stage and they were now planning to begin filming in early 2019, with the intention that Morbius would be the second film released as part of Sony's shared universe after Venom. He added that Leto was bringing the same "intensity" to the film that he had brought to playing the Joker in Suicide Squad (2016). By November, box office analysts believed that Venom had been successful enough for Sony to move ahead with other films like Morbius, and at the end of that month the studio dated an untitled Marvel film that was believed to be Morbius for a July 10, 2020, release. Adria Arjona entered negotiations to portray the film's female lead, Martine Bancroft, in December; her involvement was confirmed a month later when Sony pushed the release date to July 31, and Matt Smith also joined the cast in an undisclosed role. Art Marcum and Matt Holloway made uncredited contributions to the film's script.

=== Filming ===
Principal photography began during the last week of February 2019 in London, under the working title Plasma. Oliver Wood served as cinematographer for the film, which would be the last he would do so before his death in February 2023. With the start of filming, Jared Harris and Tyrese Gibson joined the cast as Michael's mentor and an FBI agent hunting Michael, respectively. Smith was reported to be portraying the villainous Loxias Crown / Hunger, though he was later revealed to be playing an original character named Milo who is similar to Loxias Crown. Harris was revealed to be portraying Dr. Nicholas, a mentor and father figure to both Michael and Milo. In March, filming took place in Manchester's Northern Quarter, doubling for New York City. A month later, Gibson revealed that he was portraying Simon Stroud, and that Al Madrigal had been cast as his partner, Alberto Rodriguez. At the end of the month, Justin Haythe was believed to have contributed to the film's script. Filming was scheduled to take 12 weeks, and Venom producer Amy Pascal said in June that production had "just wrapped" on the project. Production also occurred at Pinewood Studios.

=== Post-production ===
In September 2019, Sony announced a new agreement with Disney that extended a previous deal to have Marvel Studios and its president Kevin Feige produce a sequel to Far From Home, keeping Spider-Man in Marvel's shared universe, the Marvel Cinematic Universe. As part of the new agreement, Feige stated that moving forward the MCU's Spider-Man would be able to "cross cinematic universes" and appear in Sony's own shared universe as well. This interaction was said to be "a 'call and answer' between the two franchises as they acknowledge details between the two in what would loosely be described as a shared detailed universe". The film's first trailer, released in January 2020, includes a brief appearance by Michael Keaton, reprising his role as Adrian Toomes / Vulture from the coproduced Marvel Studios film Spider-Man: Homecoming. Some of Keaton's scenes had to be reshot when the events depicted in Spider-Man: No Way Home (2021) did not properly coincide with Morbius. Keaton admitted that he was hastily informed over the reason for his character appearing in Morbius, adding that "even they couldn't quite explain it." Certain moments, such as Michael walking past a graffiti painting of Spider-Man, were added in the film without Espinosa's knowledge, only to be removed in the final film.

Reshoots for the film began in Los Angeles by early February 2020, and were finished a month later when film productions around the United States were halted due to the COVID-19 pandemic. At the end of March, the film's release date was pushed back to March 19, 2021, due to the pandemic closing theaters around the world. In January 2021, the film was delayed again, first to October 8, 2021, and then to January 21, 2022, when No Time to Die was moved to the October 2021 date. At the end of January, Leto revealed that additional reshoots were taking place in mid-February. The film's release was moved back another week at the end of April 2021, moving to January 28, 2022. At the start of January 2022, the film was delayed to April 1, 2022, due to the box office success of Spider-Man: No Way Home which Sony hoped would continue throughout early 2022. Later that month, Corey Johnson was revealed to have a role in the film. In March, visual effects supervisor Matthew E. Butler revealed that motion capture technology had been used for Leto to portray Michael's vampiric form. Espinosa cited Pokémon as an influence on the portrayal of Michael's powers, specifically singling out the series's use of light and color to depict the title creatures' attacks and abilities.

== Music ==
By October 2019, Jon Ekstrand was set to compose the score for Morbius after doing the same for Espinosa's previous films. Ekstrand's score was released digitally by Madison Gate Records on April 8, 2022.

== Marketing ==
The teaser trailer for the film was released on January 13, 2020. Julia Alexander at The Verge described the premise of the film as presented by the trailer as "ridiculous", while Matt Goldberg of Collider felt it looked "silly" and also noted that the film looked very similar to Venom, which he acknowledged was commercially successful. Scott Mendelson, writing for Forbes, agreed with the comparison to Venom which he felt was a good move by Sony due to the success of their last few Spider-Man films, but cautioned that Leto may not have the same box office draw for general audiences that Tom Hardy gave to Venom. Much of the discussion surrounding the trailer centered on the revelation of Keaton's role and the visual reference to Spider-Man, which led to questions about the film's relationship with the Spider-Man films and the wider Marvel Cinematic Universe. A second trailer was released on November 2, 2021, and led to further confusion and speculation about the film's connections to other franchises. Fans and commentators noted that the trailer, in addition to the Venom films, also references Sam Raimi's Spider-Man trilogy, Marc Webb's The Amazing Spider-Man films, and the MCU Spider-Man films despite all three franchises being set in different fictional universes. Prior to the film's theatrical release, Espinosa clarified that Morbius is set in the same universe as the SSU Venom films.

In March 2022, Sony used their The Daily Bugle promotional TikTok account, previously used for Spider-Man: No Way Home, to market Morbius; the videos feature Nicque Marina reporting on events relative to the film.

== Release ==
=== Theatrical ===
Morbius had its world premiere at the Plaza Carso in Mexico City on March 10, 2022, and was released in the United States on April 1, 2022, in IMAX and other premium large formats. It was originally set for release on July 10, 2020, before moving three weeks later to July 31. The film was then delayed due to the COVID-19 pandemic, firstly to March 19, 2021, then to October 8, 2021, and to January 21, 2022, before moving a week later to January 28. It was then delayed again to the April 2022 date. Sony chose not to release the film in Russia due to the 2022 Russian invasion of Ukraine.

The film's negative reception gave rise to an ironic meme culture that framed it with exaggerated "praise", which prompted Sony to re-release the film in 1,000 theaters on June 3, 2022. This re-release also performed poorly, making just $280,000 over the weekend.

=== Home media ===
In April 2021, Sony signed agreements with Netflix and Disney for U.S. streaming and television rights to its 2022–2026 film slate, following the films' theatrical and home media windows. Netflix secured exclusive first pay window streaming rights, typically an 18-month window, which included future Marvel films set within Sony's Spider-Man Universe. Disney acquired the second pay window rights, allowing the films to stream on Disney+ and Hulu, as well as air on Disney's linear television networks. Morbius was released on digital download on May 17, 2022, and was released on Blu-ray, DVD, and 4K Ultra HD on June 14 by Sony Pictures Home Entertainment. The film subsequently began streaming on Netflix on September 7.

In the United States, Morbius ranked No. 1 on Vudu for the week ending May 21, 2022, while also placing second on iTunes and third on Google Play. The film debuted at No. 1 on the Circana's NPD VideoScan First Alert chart, leading both the combined DVD and Blu-ray Disc unit sales chart and the standalone Blu-ray Disc sales chart for the week ending June 18. Blu-ray Disc formats accounted for 67% of total sales, with 41% attributed to standard Blu-ray and 26% to 4K Ultra HD. Morbius was the best-selling DVD and Blu-ray title of June 2022, according to Circana's VideoScan tracking service. For the year, the film ranked eighteenth on the Top 50 Selling Titles on Disc (DVD and Blu-ray combined). It recorded a sales index of 23.22, with 58% of total unit sales coming from Blu-ray formats, including 17% from 4K Ultra HD. Morbius also placed sixteenth on both the Top 20 Selling Blu-ray Discs of 2022 and the Top 20 Selling 4K Ultra HD Blu-rays of 2022.

Following its release on Netflix on September 7, 2022, Morbius earned over 12 million views in its first five days. Nielsen Media Research, which records streaming viewership on U.S. television screens, reported that Morbius was streamed for 610 million minutes during the week of September 5–11, ranking as the third most-streamed film that week. The following week, from September 12–18, the film accumulated 378 million minutes of watch time, placing it as the fourth most-streamed film for that period.

== Reception ==
=== Box office ===
Morbius grossed $73.9 million in the United States and Canada, and $93.6 million in other territories, for a worldwide total of $167.5 million.

In the U.S. and Canada, Morbius was projected to gross around $33 million from 4,268 theaters in its opening weekend, with some industry tracking going as high as $40–50 million. The film earned $17.3 million on its first day, including $5.7 million from Thursday preview screenings. It went on to debut to $39 million, beating expectations and finishing first at the box office. In its second weekend of release in the U.S. and Canada, the film grossed $10.2 million and finished second behind Sonic the Hedgehog 2, while experiencing a drop of 74%, the second-worst of all time for a superhero movie, behind only Steel (1997), and the worst of any tentpole superhero movie. It fell to sixth place at the box office in its third weekend, grossing $4.7 million (a drop of 54%), and dropped to ninth place in its fourth weekend with $2.3 million (a drop of 51%). The film earned $1.5 million in its fifth weekend, finishing tenth. Morbius dropped out of the box office top ten in its sixth weekend. The film's "re-release" in theaters during its tenth weekend made $310,665 from 1,037 screens during its first three days.

Outside the U.S. and Canada, the film earned $44.9 million from 62 international markets in its opening weekend, including $2.5 million from IMAX screens. It added $15 million in its second weekend for a drop of 62%. It added $6.7 million in the third weekend, $3.3 million in its fourth, and $1.6 million in its fifth.

On June 3, 2022, Sony announced the film would return to 1,000 theaters weeks after its initial theatrical and digital release. This was largely attributed to the film's influx in attention from Internet memes in the weeks prior. This decision was also met with criticism from various outlets, which speculated that the release was because Sony was unaware that the Internet trend was not due to legitimate popular admiration towards the film. Upon its re-release the film performed very poorly, making only $85,000 on the day it was released, with many outlets claiming the film bombed for a second time. After a dismal $300,000 weekend performance in its re-release—a $289 per-theater average—Sony pulled the film entirely from theaters; it was the 14th highest-grossing film domestically for its short re-release period.

=== Critical response ===
On Rotten Tomatoes, the film has an approval rating of 15% based on 285 reviews, with an average rating of 3.8/10. The website's critics consensus reads, "Cursed with uninspired effects, rote performances, and a borderline nonsensical story, this dreary mess is a vein [sic] attempt to make Morbius happen." It ranks as the 18th worst-reviewed superhero movie on the site. Metacritic assigned the film a weighted average score of 35 out of 100 based on 55 critics, indicating "generally unfavorable reviews". Indo-Asian News Service described the film as having been "utterly ravaged" by critics, and Variety reported reception as being "comically bad". Jonathon Crump of Manchester Evening News reported that early reviews to the film are mixed at best, although he noted that some critics "praised the acting in the film, including Leto's performance". Variety's Ellise Shafer also said while the reviews were negative overall, Smith "did receive some praise for his performance". Audiences polled by CinemaScore gave the film an average grade of "C+" on an A+ to F scale, while those at PostTrak gave it a 62% positive score (with an average 2.5 out of 5 stars), with 47% saying they would definitely recommend it. The C+ score is the second-worst of any Marvel adaptation, ahead of only Fantastic Four (2015).

Reviewing the film for Collider, Emma Kiely felt that the "central problem of Morbius is a lazy and uninspiring script" and added that "no weight or depth is given to any character." She also noted that there is "little humor" in the film and "when it tries to make a tongue-in-cheek joke, it fails miserably." Barry Hertz of The Globe and Mail panned the film, saying it "is charmless, incoherent, ugly and so aggressively stupid that it defies any attempt to shove it into the desperate 'guilty pleasure' box." Wendy Ide of The Observer gave the film 1 out of 5 stars, calling it an "incoherent, vampire-themed Marvel offcut." Hannah Strong of Little White Lies also gave the film 1 out of 5 stars, describing it as "soulless, tedious filmmaking". Richard Roeper of the Chicago Sun-Times awarded the film 2 out of 4 stars, saying: "It looks like Morbius might soon cross paths with Spider-Man in one universe or another, but that would be a big step up for him, because his introductory vehicle feels more like a just-average 1990s vampire movie." Mick LaSalle of the San Francisco Chronicle awarded the film a 3 out of 4, and called the film "briskly riveting" and a "perfect antidote to bloated The Batman". Chris Bumbray of JoBlo.com gave the film a 6 out of 10 and called it "a decent enough start for the latest addition to the Sony Spider-Man Universe" while also praising the cinematography and "horror aspects" of the plot.

Leah Greenblatt of Entertainment Weekly gave the film a B grade, saying that Leto "hits the right notes of fear and longing in a surprisingly restrained performance". Stephanie Zacharek of Time commended Leto's performance writing that it has a "quietly vibrating vulnerability". In a 2 out of 5 review, Donald Clarke of The Irish Times said, "No harm to Leto, who wears less makeup as a vampire here than he did as a human in House of Gucci, but he appears to be taking the silly role absurdly seriously." The Hollywood Reporter's David Rooney said the film "only intermittently matches the intensity" of Leto's performance and wrote: "It's just a shame this opening salvo takes itself too seriously to have much fun with the mayhem, despite the potential in Smith's devilish turn for amusing interplay between the antagonists." Matt Donato of IGN, who awarded the film a 5 out of 10, praised Smith's performance for providing a "colorfulness the film desperately needs", saying that his "flamboyance and spirit is the antithesis to Leto's drearily dour genius, which is a purposeful but inefficient comparison", and unfavorably compared Leto's solemn performance to Tom Hardy's "campy" performance in the Venom films."

The post-credits scenes also came under heavy scrutiny and became a joke in the eyes of the general public due to the failed fan service, confusing and incoherent explanation, and dialogue. Kate Erbland of IndieWire stated, "This is confusing stuff, and the appearance of Keaton in a pair of [mid-credits] scenes does little to help the sense that Morbius is mostly incoherent, or at least very at odds with whatever it's trying to say." Julia Glassman of The Mary Sue found the overall reveal weak, stating, "I'm beginning to wonder if Sony just... doesn't quite get the point of [mid-credits] scenes." Time Out's Cathy Brennan felt that the film's "attempts" to "court an audience by dangling a potential connection" to the MCU's Spider-Man is "the worst kind of unearned fan service in a film this lacklustre."

=== Other responses ===
In August 2022, Matt Smith said of the film's reception, "Yeah, it was thrown under the bus. But you just have to roll with it. What else are you gonna do? It's a film, at the end of the day, we're not saving lives. For whatever reason, it didn't quite work out and… It is what it is." In September 2024, Jared Harris said he took his role in the film to pay off a mortgage, and added, "I have observed that those types of films do well if you have a sense of humour. You can't treat it as though it's Shakespeare. So yeah, that movie could have done with a more mischievous sense of humour."

Two years after the film's release, Espinosa expressed regret over making the film, stating, "To make a movie through committee, I think, is very hard, and I felt in the end that maybe a different director would have been a better fit."

=== Accolades ===
At the 43rd Golden Raspberry Awards, Morbius received nominations for Worst Picture, Worst Director, and Worst Screenplay; and won Worst Actor and Worst Supporting Actress.

=== Internet memes ===
Due to its lackluster box office performance and dour critical reception, Morbius inspired various Internet memes. Polygon wrote that the film became "a kind of collective internet hate watch", with fans sharing meme shitposts which ironically praised it. (Note: Attributed to multiple sources:) Following its release, the hashtag #MorbiusSweep, which jokingly claimed Morbius was the most financially and critically successful film of all time, began trending. Claims included the film becoming the first to sell over a trillion tickets, the first to make over a "morbillion" dollars, receiving an impossible 203% or higher approval rating (and similarly-impossible 142% or higher audience rating) from Rotten Tomatoes, and an edited screenshot of the Wikipedia page covering the highest-grossing films, with Morbius supposedly having earned $352.9 trillion. Another example made the claim that Martin Scorsese, who had previously declared that superhero films were not cinema, had changed his mind after seeing the film; this fake quote was shared on Instagram by Morbius actor Tyrese Gibson and later deleted, which journalists attributed to Gibson believing it was genuine.

The film received a resurgence in Internet memes following its release to video on demand, with many involving the fake catchphrase "it's Morbin' time", a play on the Power Rangers catchphrase "it's Morphin' time" and/or the Ben Grimm catchphrase "It's Clobberin' Time". Users on the film's official Discord server call themselves "Morbheads", and users engaged in "Morbin'" on various Discord servers by distributing pirated copies. A large number of channels on the live-streaming service Twitch began illegally hosting the entire film on repeat; one channel, Morbius247, was banned after acquiring thousands of followers. Morbius piracy spread to other platforms, including Twitter, where the entire film was posted in a series of 52 two-minute long videos, compressed into a 30-second long video, and the entire script copy-and-pasted into individual tweets. On Tumblr, the entire film was compressed into a minuscule GIF file and widely spread. Additionally, viral fake news posts claiming that a Morbius sequel had been greenlit as a result of the Internet memes spread on Twitter, leading "Morbius 2" to trend on the website, in addition to the phrase "it's Morbin' time" trending on Twitter for a week.

Leto, in response to the memes, tweeted "What time is it?" and a 19-second video where he was "caught" reading a script titled Morbius 2: It's Morbin' Time "written" by himself under the pseudonym Bartholomew Cubbins. Following the financial failure of the re-release, a petition was started on Change.org to put the film back in theaters for a third time with the claim that "we were all busy that weekend".

== Future ==
In January 2021, Leto said there was potential for Michael to appear alongside the character Blade in a future project, with Mahershala Ali cast in that role for the Marvel Cinematic Universe (MCU). That December, in discussing the introduction of the multiverse in Spider-Man: No Way Home (2021), Leto said there was potential for further crossovers with his character in future films. Tom Holland expressed interest in seeing his version of Spider-Man from the MCU fighting Michael in the future, while producers Kevin Feige and Amy Pascal confirmed interest in a potential film starring both Leto and Ali. In March 2022, Leto also expressed interest in a future film featuring Michael appearing alongside Venom, portrayed by Tom Hardy. During CinemaCon 2022, Sony announced numerous Marvel projects. Some outlets noted that while Venom: The Last Dance (2024) and Spider-Man: Beyond the Spider-Verse were announced, there was no announcement for a Morbius sequel, leaving the character's future in question. In December 2024, it was reported that Kraven the Hunter would be the final film in Sony's Spider-Man Universe, ending any possibility of a sequel to Morbius. This seemed to be confirmed as in August 2026, Rothman stated that there aren't any spin-offs in active development.
