= Hunger (Marvel Comics) =

Comic book supervillain

Publication information
- Publisher: Marvel Comics
- First appearance: Spider-Man #76 (January 1997)
- Created by: Howard Mackie

In-story information
- Alter ego: Loxias Crown
- Species: Pseudo-vampire (human mutate)
- Team affiliations: Hydra
- Abilities: Superhuman strength, speed and durability Flight; Genius-level intellect Hypnotism; Accelerated healing factor Heightened senses Formerly: Darkforce energy generation and projection via armor

Hunger (Loxias Crown) is a fictional character appearing in the American comic books published by Marvel Comics. The character first appeared in Spider-Man #76 (January 1997) and was created by Howard Mackie. He is an enemy of Spider-Man, Blade, and Morbius.

Matt Smith portrays a composite character partially inspired by Hunger named Milo, whose birth name is Lucien, in the Sony's Spider-Man Universe (SSU) film Morbius (2022).

== Publication history ==
Created by Howard Mackie, the character first appeared in Spider-Man #76 (January 1997).

== Fictional character biography ==
Loxias Crown is an agent of Hydra equipped with armor that manipulated a mysterious energy known as Darkforce. After killing the armor's creator, William Fields, Crown takes Empire State University's staff and students hostage to locate Fields' notes on his armor's technology, but is defeated by Spider-Man and S.H.O.C. Crown next abducts Morbius to perform experiments alongside Andrea Janson for Don Fortunato. Crown threatens Peter Parker until Todd Fields surrenders, teleporting the two to his secret base. After Hammerhead kills his love and captures his three hostages, Crown takes Hydra's airship to get revenge. Morbius attacks Crown and drains him dry before disappearing.

Due to Morbius's attack, Crown becomes a pseudo-vampire called Hunger. After Hunger begins abducting civilians, Spider-Man works with Marrow to free the prisoners, much to Hunger's annoyance. Flash Thompson distracts Hunger, resulting in his defeat by Spider-Man and Marrow, but he escapes in energy form. Hunger later attacks a clandestine meeting between the Kingpin and the Maggia, and turns a number of gangsters into pseudo-vampires. Blade and Spider-Man track Hunger down, but he manages to escape.

In Blood Hunt, Hunger is killed by Union Jack following a failed attempt to conquer Manchester.

== Powers and abilities ==
Initially, Loxias Crown wore an armor similar to S.H.O.C. which gave him the ability to channel negative energy and fire energy blasts.

As a pseudo-vampire, Hunger does not possess all the powers or weaknesses of an undead vampire. He possesses a variety of superhuman powers, some of which are similar to undead vampires, such as superhuman strength, speed and durability, as well as heightened senses including night vision and echolocation. Due to his vampire-like condition, Hunger is forced to ingest fresh blood from living humans on a regular basis to sustain his life and vitality. He does not possess any of the mystical vulnerabilities that true undead vampires are subject to, such as garlic, holy water, crucifixes, or silver. Hunger is not completely affected by sunlight, which diminishes his powers rather than killing him.

== Reception ==
In 2022, CBR.com ranked Hunger 9th in their "10 Most Important Marvel Vampires" list.

== In other media ==
A composite character partly inspired by Hunger along with Emil Nikos, Vic Slaughter, and Michael Morbius, named Milo appears in Morbius (2022), portrayed by Matt Smith as an adult and Joseph Esson as a child. Depicted as Michael Morbius's surrogate brother and best friend, having met under the care of Emil Nicholas as both are suffering from a rare blood disease which prevented their bodies from properly being able to create blood, and born "Lucien", Milo is renamed as-such by Morbius as a child, before being sent away to private school. As adults, Milo's family wealth is key to Morbius's research for a cure, but causes "pseudo-vampirism", with Morbius seeking to resist the resulting bloodlust while Milo embraces it. After Milo kills Nicholas, Morbius restrains Milo with an army of vampire bats and seemingly kills him with a vampire-antibody.
