= The Daily Bugle (web series) =

Faux news web series

- Genre: Fiction; News program; Promotional; Superhero
- Directed by: Heather Traska; Jon Watts
- Presented by: J. K. Simmons; Angourie Rice; Nicque Marina
- Country of origin: United States
- Original language: English
- No. of seasons: 3
- No. of episodes: 29

Production
- Production companies: Sony Pictures; Marvel Studios

Original release
- Network: YouTube; TikTok
- Release: October 19, 2019 – April 29, 2022

The Daily Bugle (formerly TheDailyBugle.net) is an American faux current affairs digital series serving as the center of several viral marketing campaigns created by Sony Pictures. Based on the fictional newspaper agency of the same name appearing in several Marvel Comics publications — the YouTube videos initially began as marketing for the Marvel Cinematic Universe (MCU) film Spider-Man: Far From Home, and deal with major events depicted in the MCU and later the Sony's Spider-Man Universe (SSU) films, with the second and third seasons primarily releasing on TikTok.

The first season of the news program features J. K. Simmons as J. Jonah Jameson, reprising his role from the MCU films and Sam Raimi's Spider-Man trilogy. Several other actors reprise their roles from the films, while archival footage of others is also used. The initial videos were released from October to November 2019, focusing on the immediate aftermath of Spider-Man: Far From Home. A second season, leading up to the events of the sequel Spider-Man: No Way Home and featuring Angourie Rice reprising her role as Betty Brant, began in November 2021. A third season, leading up to the events of the SSU film Morbius and featuring Nicque Marina as a fictionalized version of herself, released in March 2022, separately from the No Way Home videos.

The videos are accompanied by additional marketing materials, such as in-universe web articles and social media posts. The series has been received positively, seen as better than average viral marketing campaigns, and as a fun and insightful expansion of the MCU for fans of the franchise.

== Episodes ==
Season	Episodes	Originally released		
Season	Episodes	First released	Last released	Network
1	6	October 23, 2019	November 20, 2019	YouTube
2	19	November 24, 2021	April 29, 2022	YouTube and TikTok
3	4	March 18, 2022	March 31, 2022	TikTok

=== Spider-Man: Far From Home campaign (2019) ===
No. overall	No. in campaign	Title	Guest(s)	Original release date	Runtime
1	1	"Mysterio Final Moments"	Jake Gyllenhaal as Quentin Beck (Note: Footage from Spider-Man: Far From Home (2019))	October 23, 2019	0:24
TheDailyBugle.net presents the first part of Mysterio's edited video, framing Spider-Man for his murder and the London victims. (Note: As depicted in Spider-Man: Far From Home (2019))
2	2	"Footage From Tower Bridge Attack"	Tony Revolori as Flash Thompson	October 29, 2019	0:33
TheDailyBugle.net presents footage of social media influencer Flash Thompson's perspective of the Elemental fusion attack on Tower Bridge.
3	3	"Spider-Man is a Menace!"	None	October 29, 2019	0:34
Host J. Jonah Jameson, being highlighted as a trustworthy representative, accuses Spider-Man as a fraud while Mysterio is praised as a hero.
4	4	"Spider-Man Unmasked"	Jake Gyllenhaal as Quentin Beck Tom Holland as Peter Parker / Spider-Man	October 30, 2019	1:12
Jameson presents the second part of Mysterio's video, exposing Spider-Man's real identity as Peter Parker and a criminal menace.
5	5	"Coney Island re-opened years after devastating crash"	None	November 6, 2019	0:25
TheDailyBugle.net reports of Coney Island's 2024 reopening, noting that locals blamed the 2016 destruction for businessman Adrian Toomes instead of Spider-Man. (Note: As depicted in Spider-Man: Homecoming (2017))
6	6	"London Attack — Tower Bridge Bill Blues"	None	November 20, 2019	0:27
Following the 2024 presidential election, TheDailyBugle.net reports that the UK Prime Minister and 10 Downing Street have demanded repayment from the US government after Spider-Man was revealed as responsible for the Tower Bridge attack.

=== Spider-Man: No Way Home campaign (2021–2022) ===
Episodes six through eight and eleven are Burning Questions with Betty Brant episodes. The campaign released additional videos as a bonus feature with Spider-Man: No Way Home's (2021) digital release in March 2022, with further episodes being released in April.

No. overall	No. in campaign	Title	Guest(s)	Original release date	Runtime
7	1	"Hi TikTok! Welcome to The Daily Bugle! Follow us for breaking news on Spider-Man you can't get anywhere else."	None	November 24, 2021	0:31
Betty Brant is hired by The Daily Bugle as an intern and placed in charge of their TikTok account. Initially excited and the prospect of "her first real job", she then finds she is unpaid.
8	2	"Tell us you hate Spider-Man without telling us... (even if you don't actually hate him)."	None	November 24, 2021	0:14
As Betty Brant attempts to tell The Daily Bugle that Peter Parker is a "very nice" person who saved her life, she is cut off by J. Jonah Jameson referring to Parker as a "Spider-Menace".
9	3	"Join us as an intern of The Daily Bugle, no experience required! Get our reporter pack from our in bio."	None	November 24, 2021	0:31
With the expansion of The Daily Bugle to a "journalist juggernaut" in addition to a website, a crazily-smiling Betty Brant provides an offer of further internships to other interested parties with a free reporter pack, in order to call in with sightings of Spider-Man in action: "Spider-Man sightings, misguided opinions, vague rumours, and craziest conspiracy theories, today!"
10	4	"Lightning and sand storms in NYC? Find out who's behind it all in our latest report!"	None	December 2, 2021	0:58
Betty Brant reports on the sightings of Electro and Sandman in New York City; (Note: As depicted in Spider-Man: No Way Home (2021)) after speculating that "supervillains are back", Brant changes tune to blame the "Spider-Menace" for faking the attacks and storms as with the Elementals, after being spoken to by Jameson. (Note: Voice only)
11	5	"Do YOU have what it takes to become a reporter for The Daily Bugle? Duet this and show us if you can handle this #Teleprompter Challenge!"	None	December 3, 2021	0:49
Betty Brant oversees an official The Daily Bugle teleprompter challenge, asking viewers to read out a passage condemning Spider-Man for the murder of interdimensional hero Mysterio.
12	6	"Daily Bugle Exclusive: a chat with one of Peter Parker's teachers, Coach Wilson."	Hannibal Buress as Coach Wilson	December 7, 2021	0:23
In a preview of a new segment of The Daily Bugle called Burning Questions with Betty Brant, Betty Brant interviews her former high school coach Wilson, questioning him over why he had "never noticed [Peter Parker] had extraordinary athletic abilities" while teaching him, before Wilson points out that with Midtown High being a science-based school, "two push-ups" could be considered an act of "extraordinary athletic ability". Closing off the segment with The Last Word, J. Jonah Jameson recommends homeschooling, before proudly mentioning that he was homeschooled himself.
13	7	"Daily Bugle Exclusive: meet author Eugene "Flash" Thompson — the creator of the name "Spider-Man.""	Tony Revolori as Flash Thompson	December 10, 2021	0:28
In a preview of Burning Questions with Betty Brant, Betty Brant interviews her former classmate turned published "patriot" author Eugene "Flash" Thompson, who has published a book about his relationship with Peter Parker and having been the first to dub him as "Spider-Man" when uploading footage of him to YouTube years earlier, before knowing Parker was Spider-Man, having also considered the names "Arachnokid" and "The Bitten". In The Last Word, Jameson states that "I wouldn't let that kid near a dog park, let alone a public school."
14	8	"Daily Bugle Exclusive: a sit-down with Peter Parker's best friend, Ned Leeds."	Jacob Batalon as Ned Leeds	December 10, 2021	0:23
In a preview of Burning Questions with Betty Brant, Betty Brant interviews her ex-boyfriend and Peter Parker's best friend Ned Leeds; however, instead of asking about Parker, Betty asks Ned about "what is an appropriate text sent to your ex-girlfriend in the middle of the night" – after an awkward moment of silence, Betty compliments Ned's appearance, before signaling for her camera crew to cut after Ned mentions her continued state of beauty.
15	9	"Join us and play Put A Finger Down: Daily Bugle Edition!"	None	December 15, 2021	0:56
Betty Brant invites her viewers to participate in a "Put A Finger Down: Daily Bugle Edition" challenge, revealing the (obvious) topic word at the end of the broadcast to be "Spider-Man".
16	10	"Breaking News! Peter Parker aka. Spider-Man has been released!"	Tom Holland as Peter Parker (Note: Footage from Spider-Man: No Way Home (2021))	December 17, 2021	0:21
Betty Brant announces the release of Peter Parker / Spider-Man by authorities after being detained for the alleged murder of Mysterio.
17	11	"A Daily Bugle exclusive sit-down with Spider-Menace himself, Peter Parker"	Tom Holland as Peter Parker	December 20, 2021	0:31
Betty Brant asks Peter Parker what would he say to the spider that bit him. After Peter answers "Thanks", Betty adds "For nothing?". In The Last Word, Jameson states that "The Daily Bugle won't rest until we have untied his [Spider-Man's] web of lies".
18	12	"I was definitely hired for my journalist skills and no other reason, right??"	None	December 23, 2021	0:18
Betty Brant answers fan questions.
19	13	"Get your fix on Daily Bugle Supplements today! #Sponsored"	None	January 6, 2022	0:13
Brant and Jameson promote The Daily Bugle's sponsor, "Daily Bugle Supplements".
20	14	"TheDailyBugle.net: EXCLUSIVE – Web of Lies!" (Note: Part of this episode was originally depicted in the mid-credits scene of the Sony's Spider-Man Universe film Venom: Let There Be Carnage (2021).)	Tom Holland as Peter Parker / Spider-Man	April 5, 2022 (Note: Originally released on March 15, 2022, as a bonus feature with the digital release of Spider-Man: No Way Home (2021))	1:19
After reporting on civilians demanding Parker's birth certificate, J. Jonah Jameson assures viewers of The Daily Bugle that they will uncover Parker's "web of lies".
21	15	"TheDailyBugle.net: EXCLUSIVE – Sticky Street Job"	None	April 5, 2022	0:42
The Daily Bugle reports on Spider-Man's webs being stuck across the city, as a result of him web-swinging.
22	16	"TheDailyBugle.net: EXCLUSIVE – Spider-Sycophant"	Tony Revolori as Flash Thompson	April 8, 2022	1:41
Jameson reacts to Flash Thompson's video, produced ahead of the Midtown School of Science and Technology's first day in the 2024–2025 season, encouraging viewers to home school before proudly saying he was home schooled himself.
23	17	"TheDailyBugle.net – Spider-Menace Tip Line"	Tom Holland as Peter Parker / Spider-Man	April 14, 2022	0:37
The Daily Bugle produces a video ensuring viewers to visit a Spider-Man tip line after witnessing the vigilante.
24	18	"TheDailyBugle.net: EXCLUSIVE – "Savies" A New Menace Emerges"	None	April 29, 2022	0:37
Jameson reports on "savies", a "dangerous" new trend on social media where citizens take selfies while being saved by superheroes.
25	19	"TheDailyBugle.net: EXCLUSIVE – The Spider-Menace Strikes Again!"	None	April 29, 2022	1:15
The Daily Bugle reports on Spider-Man "damaging" a power grid outside the city; a witness states that he saw Spider-Man repairing the cell towers "all night" after defeating an individual who was "absorbing" the grid's energy.

=== Morbius campaign (2022) ===
No. overall	No. in campaign	Title	Guest(s)	Original release date	Runtime
26	1	"BREAKING NEWS about Dr. Michael Morbius from our NEW social correspondent"	Jared Leto as Dr. Michael Morbius (Note: Footage from Morbius (2022))	March 18, 2022	1:01
Nicque Marina introduces herself as having taken the "unusually hazardous job" of social correspondent at TheDailyBugle.net, reporting on Dr. Michael Morbius' recent public rejection of a prestigious award from the scientific community, (Note: As depicted in Morbius (2022)) before elaborating on who Morbius is: the world's leading expert on blood diseases, the director of the prestigious Horizon Labs, and the inventor of "synthetic blood", something Marina believes will either be "very helpful, or a disaster".
27	2	"This just in: Dr. Michael Morbius is missing! Stitch this video with any info about his whereabouts!"	Adria Arjona as Martine Bancroft	March 24, 2022	0:51
Nicque Marina reports on a mysterious cargo ship that has washed ashore on Long Island with Dr. Michael Morbius now currently missing. Dr. Martine Bancroft was also reportedly on board. Marina then states how upset she is about this as Bancroft was an Idol for her and they both did STEM.
28	3	"Developing story: Dr. Michael Morbius has been found looking... healthier than ever."	Jared Leto as Dr. Michael Morbius	March 29, 2022	1:24
29	4	"A super creature spotted in New York City! Could Dr. Michael Morbius be involved? @nicquemarina reports from the safety of her closet."	Jared Leto as Dr. Michael Morbius	March 31, 2022	1:37

== Cast and characters ==
- J. K. Simmons as J. Jonah Jameson (seasons 1–2), the presenter of The Daily Bugle who is carrying out a media smear campaign against the vigilante Spider-Man.
- Angourie Rice as Betty Brant (season 2), Peter Parker's classmate at the Midtown School of Science and Technology and a new (unpaid) intern at The Daily Bugle who has been put in charge of its TikTok account. She often attempts to counter Jameson's defamation of Parker having known him personally, much to his dismay.
- Nicque Marina as a fictionalized version of herself (season 3), a new social correspondent at The Daily Bugle reporting on the crime spree of Dr. Michael Morbius.

Also reprising their roles from the Marvel Cinematic Universe (MCU) films are Tony Revolori as social media influencer Eugene "Flash" Thompson, Hannibal Buress as Midtown High gym teacher Coach Wilson, Jacob Batalon as Ned Leeds, and Tom Holland as Peter Parker / Spider-Man, with Jake Gyllenhaal appearing as Quentin Beck / Mysterio via archive footage from Spider-Man: Far From Home. In the third season, footage of Jared Leto and Adria Arjona as Dr. Michael Morbius and Martine Bancroft from the Sony's Spider-Man Universe (SSU) film Morbius is used.

== Production ==
From 2002 to 2007, the character of J. Jonah Jameson was featured in a trilogy of live-action films directed by Sam Raimi, serving as a major source of comic relief throughout the series, retaining a dislike for Spider-Man and taking delight in anything that might discredit or defame him, but remains a good man at his core. After reprising the role in numerous animated projects, Simmons expressed interest in reprising the role in live-action in Marc Webb's The Amazing Spider-Man duology in April 2014, should the studio offer him the role.

Simmons ultimately reprised his role as a re-imagined alternate reality version of J. Jonah Jameson in Spider-Man: Far From Home, released in the United States on July 2, 2019, making him the first live-action character to be portrayed by the same actor in two different franchises, also reprising the role as the same incarnation of the character in Sony's Spider-Man Universe. Contrastingly to his original depiction, J. Jonah Jameson appears as the host of TheDailyBugle.net, a sensationalist "InfoWars-type video platform." Director Jon Watts noted that Simmons' performance was over-the-top in Raimi's films, but now that same performance has real-world comparisons, such as Alex Jones. According to Kevin Feige, the changes in the real world also meant that moving the character from a newspaper editor to a "radical right news journalist that kind of scream[s] in front of the camera" made more sense. Simmons said he and Watts did not see "eye to eye" on the film's contemporary portrayal of the character versus his performance in Raimi's films.

Simmons announced that he has signed on to play J. Jonah Jameson for more films in the MCU and the SSU; following the home media release of Spider-Man: Far From Home by Sony Pictures Home Entertainment on digital on September 17, 2019, and on Ultra HD Blu-ray, Blu-ray, and DVD on October 1, a viral marketing series of shorts starring Simmons, expanding upon his role in and set immediately after the events of Far From Home running the faux news program TheDailyBugle.net, including an in-character Twitter account. Footage of Simmons as Jameson, implied to be part the Spider-Man: No Way Home promotional campaign, appears in the mid-credits scene of the 2021 SSU film Venom: Let There Be Carnage; this was officially released as part of the No Way Home campaign on YouTube, named "Web of Lies!", in April 2022.

Simmons returned as J. Jonah Jameson, with Tony Revolori also returning as Eugene "Flash" Thompson. Marvel partnered with Sony Pictures to produce the videos, which follow the character in the immediate aftermath of Spider-Man: Far From Home, and the buildup to Spider-Man: No Way Home, while featuring numerous easter eggs to the MCU, including such events such as the criminal career and arrest of Adrian Toomes. In addition to archive footage of Tom Holland and Jake Gyllenhaal from the Spider-Man films, the videos also use original material, and footage showing the aftermath of Mysterio's attacks. The second season, primarily released through TikTok and later YouTube, features Angourie Rice as Betty Brant alongside Simmons, depicted as a new (unpaid) intern at TheDailyBugle.net put in charge of its TikTok account. The third season, also released through TikTok and taking place in the SSU, features Nicque Marina as a fictionalized version of herself, depicted as a new social correspondent at The Daily Bugle reporting on the crime spree of Dr. Michael Morbius; the No Way Home videos are released in a non-chronological order relative to the events of the film.

== Release ==
The first season was made available on TheDailyBugle.net YouTube channel, with some of them debuting in publications such as Facebook and The Mary Sue. TheDailyBugle.net videos also appear as bonus features on the Blu-ray release of Spider-Man: Far From Home (2019). The second and third seasons were made available on TheDailyBugle.net TikTok channel, with the official website redirected to it.

=== Supplementary material ===
Other content released for the viral marketing campaigns include ongoing posts on social media sites such as Twitter and Instagram, as well as a real version of the fictional TheDailyBugle.net website. Inspired by real-world "conspiracy-pushing" websites such as that of Alex Jones, the website features Simmons reprising his role as Jameson in a video where he speaks out against Spider-Man and in support of Mysterio, before adding "Thanks for watching. Don't forget to like and subscribe!" The website includes testimonials from supposed victims of "the Blip", including one complaining that they disappeared in a dangerous situation and were seriously injured when they reappeared. This contradicts a statement by Feige saying that anyone in such a situation would have reappeared safely. Several days after this was pointed out, the website was updated to say this story was faked for an insurance claim; with the launch of the Spider-Man No Way Home campaign in November 2021, the website was redirected to TheDailyBugle.net TikTok account.

== Reception ==
=== Critical response ===
Aaron Perine of ComicBook.com praised the decision to have Simmons return as the character, summarizing their appearance with the meme "When you own a role so much that the first reboot doesn't show your character and the second reboot straight up brings you back", accompanied by a photograph of Simmons from Sam Raimi's Spider-Man 2 (2004) hysterically laughing. Josh Weiss of Syfy Wire complimented the web series and accompanying website, saying that "Hopefully, this isn't just a one-off thing for the DVD and Blu-ray release, because Sony can milk this thing for all it's worth and ramp up excitement for the next entry." Jessica Fisher of Geek Tyrant described Simmons' appearance as "awesome but not jaw-dropping" in reviewing the first episode. Eric Diaz of Nerdist described Simmons' role as a "real delight", saying that "[e]ven though he was missing his signature flat top, fans were more than fine with his updated version of Jonah", further describing the tie-in website as a "clever marketing push", praising its "striking resemble to certain famous conspiracy blogs that shall remain nameless [InfoWars, with] the site's whole aesthetic [being] pretty much spot on."

=== Accolades ===
The TikTok campaign for Spider-Man: No Way Home was nominated for a Shorty Awards in the entertainment category.
