= Thoroughbred (series) =

Series of young adult novels

- Cover of A Horse Called Wonder
- Author: Joanna Campbell; Karen Bentley; Allison Estes; Alice Leonhardt; Dale Blackwell Gasque; Lois Symanski; Mary Newhall Anderson; Karle Dickerson; Jennifer Chu
- Country: United States
- Language: English
- Genre: Children's; Pony books
- Publisher: HarperCollins
- Published: 1991–2005
- Media type: Print
- No. of books: 104 (List of books)

Thoroughbred is a series of young-adult novels that revolves around Kentucky Thoroughbred racing and equestrianism. The series was created in 1991 by Joanna Campbell (better known as Jo Ann Simon, previously Haessig), and comprises 72 main-line books, several "super editions" and a spin-off series, Ashleigh. The series focuses on a group of core characters across multiple decades.

The books, which are intended for a primarily pre-teen, female audience, explore the characters' adventures in horse racing, eventing, and steeplechase. The books also explore the characters' familial and romantic relationships.

Thoroughbred is published by HarperEntertainment, an imprint of HarperCollins. A total of twelve different authors have contributed to the series over the fifteen years of its existence. By book 15, there were two million Thoroughbred books in print. The series concluded in 2005.

== Structure of the books ==
The Thoroughbred series is written in the third-person narrative and is typically told from a single person's viewpoint. For the first twenty-three books, the series is told from the viewpoints of Ashleigh Griffen (#1 - #5), Samantha McLean (#6 - #12), and Cindy McLean (#13 - #23). After book twenty-three, the series started what was called the "New Generation" and skipped ten years to a new group of characters: Christina Reese, Melanie Graham, Parker Townsend, and a small group of minor characters. These books were still written in the third-person, but the viewpoints of characters would alternate between books.

== Series overview ==
The series begins with Ashleigh Griffen and her adventures at Townsend Acres, a racing and breeding farm owned by Clay Townsend. Ashleigh's parents, Derek and Elaine Griffen, take over at the breeding area of Townsend Acres after their own farm, Edgardale, is sold after an outbreak around the farm and killed both mares and foals. Ashleigh dislikes her new life at first, but becomes more accustomed to it after an older mare named Townsend Holly gives birth to a small filly whom she names Wonder. Though Wonder is very weak and nearly dies multiple times, through Ashleigh's care, the filly grows up to be a Kentucky Derby and Belmont-winning racehorse.

After Ashleigh grows up, the plot shifts focus to Samantha McLean, a girl who moves to Townsend Acres with her father after the death of her mother. Samantha bonds with both Ashleigh and Wonder's son, Pride. Ashleigh gets married and moves to her husband's racing and breeding farm, alongside Samantha, her father, Wonder, and Pride. Samantha gets involved with steeplechasing and adopts Wonder's half-sister, Shining.

Samantha meets a runaway orphan, Cindy Blake, who becomes the next protagonist of the series. Cindy is eventually adopted by Samantha's father and his new wife, Beth, and rescues an abused racehorse, Glory, who she helps to train. Cindy becomes a jockey and wins the Triple Crown on Champion, Wonder's rambunctious and difficult son. Cindy is thrown off a horse and permanently injures her shoulder, which eventually ends her racing career.

After book 23, Cindy's Honor, the series skipped forward ten years and temporarily shifts focus to eventing. Ashleigh Griffen's daughter, Christina, trades Wonder's latest foal, Wonder's Legacy, for a racehorse named Sterling Dream, which she turns into an eventer.

After Wonder's death, Christina became attached to Wonder's last foal, Wonder's Star. This marked the series' return to racing. The following books are predominatently focused on Christina and her cousin Melanie training to become jockeys. Parker Townsend, the son of the owner of Townsend Acres from the original series, is both the only male protagonist and the only protagonist to retain his interest in eventing.

In the final books of the series, Ally, the daughter of two jockeys, is adopted by Cindy McLean and her husband. Allie was both interested in eventing and racing, bringing together the two disciplines in the Thoroughbred series, although she ultimately decided upon becoming a jockey. She is given Wonder's Legacy, the often-forgotten son of Ashleigh's Wonder, as a gift when she is fourteen. The last book of the series, Legacy's Gift, sees the birth of 'Allie's Wonder', the daughter of Wonder's Legacy.

== List of major characters ==
- Ashleigh Griffen Reese, the middle child of Derek and Elaine Griffen and the sister of Caroline and Rory Griffen. Ashleigh is the jockey of Wonder in the Breeders' Cup Classic, a trainer at, and eventually the owner of, Whitebrook Farm. She marries Mike Reese in Thoroughbred No. 9, Pride's Challenge, and has a daughter, Christina.
- Clay Townsend, the owner of Townsend Acres and the grandfather of Parker Townsend. He was much more kind to Ashleigh and the other characters than his son or daughter-in-law, although he turned a blind eye when it came to his son. Clay's wife is never mentioned in the books.
- Charles "Charlie" Burke, a crusty old trainer with a soft spot for young people, who helped Ashleigh nurse Wonder back to health, train, and race her. He was also instrumental in getting Ashleigh's jockey career started. After Ashleigh's grounded when her grades slip Charlie agrees with her punishment. Charlie explains that Ashleigh's parents are only doing what they think is best. He died in Pride's Challenge, from a heart attack on Ashleigh and Mike's wedding day.
- Samantha McLean Nelson, The biological child of Ian and Suzanne McLean and the step daughter of Beth McLean. The half sister of Kevin McLean and the adoptive half sister of Cindy. Ashleigh's close friend, the jockey of Sierra. She marries Tor Nelson. Later in the series, she is pregnant with twins and runs an eventing school, Whisperwood, which is attended by Christina and Parker. Prior to the "Thoroughbred" series Samantha's mother was killed in a riding accident. Ian forced Samantha to stop riding after Suzanne died and only allowed her to groom horses. Ian does this to keep Samantha safe. Ian reluctantly gives Samantha permission to ride again on the condition that she's careful.
- Brad and Lavinia Townsend, the aristocratic owners of Townsend Acres, where Ashleigh once lived. They are the parents of Parker.
- Cindy Blake McLean al-Rihani, Samantha and Kevin's adopted sister. She was a jockey until she tore her rotator cuff in an accident. Cindy eventually marries Ben al-Rihani and they adopt Allie after her parents die. Cindy's biological parents died in a car accident prior to the events of the series.
- Ian McLean, Head trainer and breeding manager at Whitebrook Farm. Samantha and Kevin's overprotective father and Cindy's adoptive father, remarried to Beth Raines, Cindy's adoptive mother. His first wife Suzanne was killed in a riding accident prior to the books. Ian refused to let Samantha ride again in an effort to keep her safe. Ian eventually realized that Suzanne wouldn't want Samantha to stop riding. Ian tells Samantha that she can ride again, but she has to be careful.
- Kevin McLean, Ian and Beth McLean's son. He is the half brother of Samantha McLean and the adoptive half brother of Cindy McLean. He dated Melanie Graham for a while.
- Christina Reese, Ashleigh and Mike's daughter, Caroline and Rory's niece, and Derek and Elaine's granddaughter. Christina is the jockey of Wonder's Star. Her boyfriend is Parker Townsend.
- Melanie Graham, Christina's cousin, is also a jockey.
- Parker Townsend, Christina's boyfriend, the son of Brad and Lavinia, and the grandson of Clay Townsend. He competes in three-day-eventing.
- Allison "Allie" Avery al-Rihani, the daughter of Jilly Gordon and Craig Avery, two early series jockeys. Cindy and Ben adopt Allie after her parents die.

== List of major horse characters ==
- Ashleigh's Wonder, the sickly foal whom Ashleigh nurses to health and trains to become a champion winning the Kentucky Derby and the Belmont Stakes as well as the Breeders' Cup Classic. Clay Townsend then gives Ashleigh a half-interest in Wonder and all her foals, which then sets up a majority of plots in the early series as conflicts occur around the management and training of her offspring. She is the daughter of Townsend Holly and Townsend Pride, half-sister to Shining (through her sire) and the dam of six foals throughout the series Wonder's Pride, Townsend Princess, Mr. Wonderful, Wonder's Champion, Wonder's Legacy and Wonder's Star. She dies after complications of the birth of her last foal.
- Townsend Prince, Wonder's half-brother and racing rival, he dies in an accident early in the series once Wonder has her first foals.
- Wonder's Pride, Wonder's first colt, a very successful racehorse winning the Kentucky Derby, the Preakness and the Breeder's Cup Classic. He retired from racing due to complications from a twisted intestine that nearly killed him in Book #10 Pride's Last Race.
- Shining Wonder's half-sister purchased at an auction by Mike Reese in Book #11, was given to Samantha McLean as a gift due to her involvement nursing the abused and neglected filly back to health. Shining became the star racer of Whitebrook Farm winning several stakes races including the Breeder's Cup Distaff (#18 Glory's Rival). Shining was the dam of Lucky Chance a filly the same age as Wonder's granddaughter, Honor Bright
- Wonder's Champion, Wonder's arguably most successful foal (by Townsend Victor), won the Triple Crown of Thoroughbred Racing and the Dubai World Cup (Books 21 and 22) after a rough start in Book 20. He was characterized as mischievous and would often misbehave and get himself into trouble, which nearly cost him his racing career.
- Sierra, a liver chestnut stallion who Samantha McLean and her boyfriend Tor Nelson trained to be a successful steeplechaser after his flop as a flat racer.
- March to Glory, a stolen horse, rescued by Cindy McLean, who would later become the star of the Whitebrook racing line for books 14–18. A half-interest in Glory was given to the Townsends in order to keep Champion training at Whitebrook (Book 18 Glory's Rival.) Glory was the subject of a scandal as a fellow trainer and veterinarian tried to drug and kill him in #16 Glory in Danger. Glory won the Breeder's Cup Classic by 30 lengths setting a new world record in Glory's Rival (#18).
- Wonder's Legacy, a forgotten colt who was Wonder's 5th foal, given to Christina Reese (#24) who would later trade her half-interest in Wonder's Legacy for Sterling Dream a Thoroughbred she would later train to become a successful eventer. Legacy was given to Allie Avery in the last books.
- Sterling Dream, owned by Christina Reese, became an eventing horse after coming off the track and being abused by a groom. In Legacy's Gift (#72) Sterling was the dam of Allie's Wonder
- Wonder's Star Wonder's last colt who won the last leg of the Triple Crown, the Belmont Stakes. He runs his best for Christina Reese.

== Authors ==
Joanna Campbell created the first fourteen Thoroughbred books, as well as the first two books in the spin-off series, Ashleigh. After Campbell stopped writing, long-time editor Karen Bentley took over, writing books fifteen through twenty-three. After Karen Bentley left the series, there was a rotating "panel" of contributing authors: Allison Estes, Alice Leonhardt, Dale Blackwell Gasque, Lois Symanski, Mary Newhall Anderson, Karle Dickerson, and Jennifer Chu. Thoroughbred #36, Without Wonder, was written under the pen name "Brooke James" by an unknown author.

== Reception ==
The series was met with mixed reviews. One review noted that while the Thoroughbred books were reliant on the cliché of a bond between a girl and a horse, they were "better written and more knowledgeable" on racing. Charlene Strickland, in a review of Wonder's Promise, wrote that while the book itself was enjoyable, it "frequently lapses into sentimentality".

Later books in the series were less well-received, with critics noting a significant decrease in quality once Campbell retired from the Thoroughbred novels.

== See also ==
- The Saddle Club
- Pony Pals
