= Heat death =

Heat death may refer to:

- Heat death of the universe, a proposed cosmological event
  - Heat death paradox, a philosophical examination of the cosmological event
- Hyperthermia, injury up to and including death, from excessive heat
- Thermal shock, the destruction of equipment by overheating
- A Supernova, heat death of a star, along with the death of the star itself

== In arts ==
- The Heat Death of the Universe, 2003 album by punk band Off Minor
- "The Heat Death of the Universe", a short story by Pamela Zoline

== See also ==
- Dead Heat (disambiguation)
- Heat Death of the Universe (disambiguation)
