= List of Thoroughbred novels =

This article contains titles of books in the Thoroughbred series, a children's novel series created by Joanna Campbell, as well as a spin-off series and other related books.

== The Thoroughbred Series ==
=== Original Series ===
1. A Horse Called Wonder
2. Wonder's Promise
3. Wonder's First Race
4. Wonder's Victory
5. Ashleigh's Dream
6. Wonder's Yearling
7. Samantha's Pride
8. Sierra's Steeplechase
9. Pride's Challenge
10. Pride's Last Race
11. Wonder's Sister
12. Shining's Orphan
13. Cindy's Runaway Colt
14. Cindy's Glory
15. Glory's Triumph
16. Glory In Danger
17. Ashleigh's Farewell
18. Glory's Rival
19. Cindy's Heartbreak
20. Champion's Spirit
21. Wonder's Champion
22. Arabian Challenge
23. Cindy's Honor
24. The Horse Of Her Dreams
25. Melanie's Treasure
26. Sterling's Second Chance
27. Christina's Courage
28. Camp Saddlebrook
29. Melanie's Last Ride
30. Dylan's Choice
31. A Home For Melanie
32. Cassidy's Secret
33. Racing Parker
34. On The Track
35. Dead Heat
36. Without Wonder
37. Star In Danger
38. Down To The Wire
39. Living Legend
40. Ultimate Risk
41. Close Call
42. The Bad Luck Filly
43. Fallen Star
44. Perfect Image
45. Star's Chance
46. Racing Image
47. Cindy's Desert Adventure (1st Lost Diary Special)
48. Cindy's Bold Start (2nd Lost Diary Special)
49. Rising Star
50. Team Player
51. Distance Runner (Jennifer Chu)
52. Perfect Challenge
53. Derby Fever
54. Cindy's Last Hope
55. Great Expectations
56. Hoofprints In The Snow
57. Faith In A Longshot
58. Christina's Shining Star
59. Star's Inspiration
60. Taking The Reins
61. Parker's Passion
62. Unbridled Fury
63. Starstruck
64. The Price Of Fame
65. Bridal Dreams
66. Samantha's Irish Luck
67. Breaking The Fall
68. Kaitlin's Wild Ride
69. Melanie's Double Jinx
70. Allie's Legacy
71. Calamity Jinx
72. Legacy's Gift

=== Super Editions ===
- Ashleigh's Christmas Miracle
- Ashleigh's Diary
- Ashleigh's Hope
- Samantha's Journey

== Other Special Titles ==
=== Cindy's Lost Diaries ===
While not Super Edition books, #47 Cindy's Desert Adventure and #48 Cindy's Bold Start are two "lost diary specials" published within the regular series in an attempt to explain the missing characters and continuity problems created by the ten-year gap which occurred between Cindy's Honor and the New Generation books. These books detail how Ashleigh miscarried her second pregnancy, the fate of Wonder's Champion, and Cindy McLean's travels to the United Arab Emirates, New York City, and finally back to Whitebrook Farm.

=== Samantha's Arc ===
Similar to the "lost diary specials", Samantha also had a two book special #65 Bridal Dreams and #66 Samantha's Irish Luck which were published within the regular series. These books are not distinguished with a separate title indicating their "special" status within the series, but are generally regarded as such and were included within the regular series also in attempts to explain Samantha's story during the ten-year gap created by the New Generation books. The books detail Samantha's marriage to Tor and their subsequent relocation to Ireland, Samantha's shifting focus from horse racing to eventing and show jumping, and the birth of Samantha and Tor's children.

== The Ashleigh Series ==
The spin-off series, Ashleigh, is 'supposedly' set in between Ashleigh's Hope and Ashleigh's Diary. However, this spin-off presents some major inconsistencies. In #2 Wonder's Promise (original series), Ashleigh states she's never attended a live horse race before; however, in the Ashleigh series (and Ashleigh's Diary, the Super Edition), she attends several races. This leads to the other error/inconsistency. In #7 Derby Day (Ashleigh series), it is said that Rhoda Kat is the first female jockey to win the Kentucky Derby. However, in the original series, Jilly Gordon clearly is. When the plague hits Ashleigh's family, various horses who survive or are sold before the first book, die (Midnight Wanderer, for example, who is put to sleep in the book, 'Goodbye Midnight Wanderer', apparently dies of the mysterious plague, rather than from the accident.) There is also large changes as to how Ashleigh and Mona get their horses. Ashleigh meets Stardust in Ashleigh's Hope and then owns (and must sell her) in Ashleigh's Diary, but in the Ashleigh Series she gets Stardust in #3 Waiting for Stardust and Stardust is expecting a foal in #15 Stardust's Foal (which this in never mentioned in Ashleigh's Hope or Ashleigh's Diary). In Ashleigh's Hope Mona gets a Thoroughbred she names Frisky on Thanksgiving Day, rubs it in, won't let Ashleigh ride Frisky, and the girls have a big fight. But in the Ashleigh Series Mona gets a Thoroughbred for Christmas, names her Frisky like she and Ashleigh had planned, says she is sorry and is not trying to rub it in as soon as she tells Ashleigh, and asks her to come over tomorrow to ride Frisky. The entire Ashleigh series is in a sort of "time bubble" and none of the events really line up with the events in the other Thoroughbred books, so it is almost a stand-alone series in and of itself.

1. Lightning's Last Hope
2. A Horse For Christmas
3. Waiting For Stardust
4. Good-Bye Midnight Wanderer
5. The Forbidden Stallion
6. A Dangerous Ride
7. Derby Day
8. The Lost Foal
9. Holiday Homecoming
10. Derby Dreams
11. Ashleigh's Promise
12. Winter Race Camp
13. The Prize
14. Ashleigh's Western Challenge
15. Stardust's Foal

== The Ashleigh Collection ==
Ashleigh's Thoroughbred Collection contains three stand alone books that do not tie into/effect the storylines of the other series. Battlecry Forever! is a slight exception though. It is about Battlecry (the sire of Fleet Goddess, a filly that Ashleigh Griffen purchases in #5 Ashleigh's Dream of the Thoroughbred series) but it is considered stand alone (due to not playing a major role in the storyline of Thoroughbred), even though it is also still technically considered the only book written outside of the Thoroughbred series that is canon.

- Battlecry, Forever!
- Star of Shadowbrook Farm
- The Forgotten Filly
