= Jessie Keane =

British author

- Born: Jessie Keane
- Occupation: Writer
- Writing career
- Genres: Crime, drama

Jessie Keane is a British author and novelist who lives in Hampshire, United Kingdom. Her fascination with London and the underworld led her to write Dirty Game, followed by bestsellers Black Widow, Scarlet Women, Jail Bird, The Make, Playing Dead and Nameless.

== Early life ==
Jessie Keane was born in Hampshire to Romani parents. The Keane family were wealthy due to the family business, however, when Jessie was fourteen, the family firm went bankrupt, and she was left struggling financially in dead end jobs. She fled to London to escape a troubled family life, and fell in love with the city and the shady characters she met around the East End and Soho.

She began writing at an early age, scripting puppet shows in primary school and winning literary prizes at the age of eight.

== Career ==
Keane sold her wedding dress and bought a second-hand computer with the proceeds to begin her writing career. Financially unstable, she penned chick lit novels without success.

After marriage and divorce, she went on to write the acclaimed novel Dirty Game, starring Annie Bailey (later to become Annie Carter). She wrote Dirty Game wearing a coat at the computer because she couldn't afford to have central heating installed. Her new partner even told her to 'get a proper job'. She sent it out to six agents, two came back straight away and one of them said she had someone who might be interested. Days later, Keane was offered a 3-book deal for a six-figure sum, and her writing career took off. Dirty Game was published in February 2008 and shot up to the top of the Heatseekers chart, after Keane phoned a popular publisher who commented that her book was "highly gripping".

After the success of Keane's first book, she went on to write a collection of books featuring Annie Bailey. Those books included Dirty Game, Scarlett Woman, Black Widow and Playing Dead. In 2008, when her first book was first published, Keane won five National Book Awards. Keane's books have been described as "utterly compelling" by television presenter Lorraine Kelly and also television presenter Phillip Schofield commented that he "couldn't put the book down". "A QUEEN OF CRIME IS BORN," said a major literary critic.

Her novel, Nameless, was a move away from Annie Bailey, and features the headstrong character, Ruby Darke and her search for her lost nameless son. Keane is currently in talks with a major film company to bring Nameless to the screen.

Keane released Ruthless in July 2013; it is the fifth book in the much acclaimed Annie Bailey/Carter series. Then came Lawless which followed Ruby Darke's progress again, then a stand-alone Dangerous and Stay Dead, the sixth of the Annie Bailey/Carter books, released to great critical acclaim. This novel follows Annie's daughter Layla, who is going to carry on the family tradition of getting into terrible scrapes in her love life and in gangland London. Fearless which tapped into Keane's own Romani background, about a bare-knuckle Romani boxer called Josh Flynn. That book was followed by The Edge (Ruby Darke again), The Knock, and The Manor released in 2020.

== Books ==
- Dirty Game (2008)
- The Make (2010)
- Black Widow (2009)
- Jail Bird (2009)
- Scarlett Women (2010)
- Playing Dead (2011)
- Nameless (2012)
- Ruthless (2013)
- Lawless (2014)
- Dangerous (2015)
- Stay Dead (2016)
- FEARLESS
- The Edge
- The Knock
- The Manor (2020)
- Never Go Back
- Dead To Me (2026)
