= Morbius =

Marvel Comics character

Morbius the Living Vampire
- Morbius taken from the variant cover of Morbius #1 (November 2019) by Greg Land

Publication information
- Publisher: Marvel Comics
- First appearance: The Amazing Spider-Man #101 (October 1971)
- Created by: Roy Thomas (writer); Gil Kane (artist)

In-story information
- Alter ego: Michael Morbius
- Species: Pseudo-vampire (human mutate)
- Team affiliations: Midnight Sons; A.R.M.O.R.; Legion of Monsters; S.H.I.E.L.D.; Agents of Wakanda
- Notable aliases: Nikos Michaels; Dr. Morgan Michaels; Number Six
- Abilities: Genius intelligence; Superhuman strength, stamina, durability, speed, agility, reflexes, healing, longevity, and senses; Flight; Hypnotism; Weakness immunity

Morbius (born Michael Morbius, also known as Morbius the Living Vampire) is a character appearing in American comic books published by Marvel Comics. Created by writer Roy Thomas and originally designed by penciler Gil Kane, he debuted as a tragic, sympathetic adversary of the superhero Spider-Man in The Amazing Spider-Man #101 (October 1971). For years, Morbius frequently clashed with Spider-Man and other superheroes while occasionally regaining his reason and helping those he regarded as allies. The 1992 Marvel Comics "Rise of the Midnight Sons" crossover event then revived and revised several horror-themed Marvel characters to present them as lead protagonists in new titles. The event launched the new series Morbius the Living Vampire, which ran from 1992 to 1995 and presented the title character as a lethal anti-hero and vigilante. After the cancellation of this series, various stories shifted back and forth between portraying Morbius as a conflicted and brutal anti-hero or a tragic character subject to episodes of madness and murder (once again, most often fighting Spider-Man).

Michael Morbius is depicted as a famous biochemist who contracts a rare blood disease which he then tries to cure by using a combination of experimental chemicals, electroshock therapy, and genetic samples of vampire bats. The experiment mutates him into a pseudo-vampire or living vampire, a life form with abilities and traits resembling, but not identical to, those of truly supernatural and "undead" creatures such as vampires (which exist in the Marvel Universe). To keep his blood disease in remission, Morbius must now regularly feed on fresh human blood or face rapid illness followed by death. Initially, Morbius' mutation affects his ability to reason while experiencing hunger. This leads to blackouts and acts of violence that result in murder and villainy, occasionally followed by lucid periods during which he regrets causing harm. A mixture of electricity and Spider-Man's blood restores his humanity for several years, but he later reverts to being a pseudo-vampire. During the "Rise of the Midnight Sons", a mixture of poison and genuine demon blood alters Morbius' physiology slightly while also restoring his mental capacity, allowing him greater control and awareness even while experiencing bloodlust. A new "anti-viral" serum involving Spider-Man's blood also allows him to regain humanity for hours at a time. Concluding he now has greater control over his condition and wishing to regain some semblance of a normal life, Morbius creates a new cover identity of Dr. Morgan Michaels, while at night secretly acting as a lethal vigilante who only feeds on "the blood of the guilty". Later on, another mutagenic serum saves his life but results in Morbius once again being vulnerable to temporary madness and a loss of his faculties when his bloodlust is too strong. As a result, he abandons his Morgan Michaels identity and becomes a fugitive again.

The character has appeared in several media adaptations outside of comics. In the 1990s animated series Spider-Man, Morbius is a recurring character voiced by Nick Jameson. In contrast to the comics, the cartoon depicted Morbius both as a regular ally of the character Blade and as a being who feeds on human plasma through his hands rather than with his fangs. Jared Leto portrayed Michael Morbius in the Sony's Spider-Man Universe (SSU) live action feature film Morbius (2022), with Matt Smith co-starring as Milo Morbius, a composite character also based on Morbius and several other characters. Following the film's release, the character became the subject of numerous internet memes.

== Publication history ==
=== Initial creation as a villain ===
Morbius debuted in The Amazing Spider-Man #101 (published in August 1971 and cover dated October 1971). His creation followed the comic book industry's self-censorship board, the Comics Code Authority, updating its policies in February 1971, which included lifting a ban on comic book stories depicting vampires and certain other supernatural characters. The issue of The Amazing Spider-Man featuring the introduction of Morbius was the first issue of Marvel Comics' flagship Spider-Man series written by someone other than character co-creator and then editor-in-chief Stan Lee, who was busy writing a screenplay for an unproduced science fiction film. Lee bequeathed the role of series writer to his right-hand editor, Roy Thomas.

In 2009, Roy Thomas said there was interest in having the company's flagship character Spider-Man fight a vampire, possibly even the famous Count Dracula. "We were talking about doing Dracula, but Stan wanted a costumed villain. Other than that, he didn't specify what we should do." Thomas added that part of the character conception came from the 1957 film The Vampire, a science fiction film he saw in his youth that depicted a man turned into a vampire by radiation rather than magic. Thomas and penciller Gil Kane then discussed and created the character together, deciding it was more appropriate for the science-fiction based Spider-Man to fight a villain given pseudo-vampiric traits via scientific rather than supernatural means. Kane based the character's appearance on that of actor Jack Palance. Thomas said the name "Morbius" was not deliberately taken from the antagonist Doctor Morbius in the 1956 film Forbidden Planet. The initial two-story arc emphasized that Morbius, like other Spider-Man villains such as the Lizard, was not truly a malicious villain but a tragic and sympathetic character who had unwittingly been changed into a monster, in this case as a result of trying to cure his own rare but fatal blood disease. The story also introduced Morbius' lover, Martine Bancroft and revealed that his first victim had been his scientific colleague and best friend, Emil Nikos. Later on, Giant-Size Spider-Man #1 (July 1974) did depict Spider-Man and Dracula together in a story, but the two characters only briefly cross paths while unaware of each other's true nature.

After their initial meeting, Morbius collided again with Spider-Man in Marvel Team-Up #3–4 (July – September 1972) and the one-shot Giant-Size Super-Heroes #1 (June 1974). Morbius went on to star in Vampire Tales, a black-and-white horror comics magazine published by Marvel's sister company, Curtis Magazines, appearing in all but two of the mature audience title's 11 issues (August 1973 – June 1975). The first Morbius solo story was written by Steve Gerber, while the rest of the stories, save for the last three, were written by Don McGregor, with penciling by Rich Buckler and by Tom Sutton, primarily. These stories focused on Morbius as more of a tragic anti-hero, one subject to blackouts and violence but who could also act altruistically towards allies and those he saw as victims of unjust circumstances.

The Amazing Spider-Man #101 (October 1971), the first appearance of Morbius, cover art by Gil Kane and John Romita Sr.

Adventure into Fear #20 (February 1974), Morbius' first starring feature in comics, cover art by Gil Kane and Frank Giacoia

After his first two Vampire Tales stories, Morbius concurrently became the star of his own feature in Marvel's bimonthly Adventure into Fear anthology series, beginning with issue #20 (February 1974) and continuing through issue #31 (December 1975), the last issue of the series. These were written, successively, by Mike Friedrich, Steve Gerber, Doug Moench and Bill Mantlo, working with a wide variety of pencillers.

Morbius was then seen as a tragic figure lamenting his past and willing to stand trial for his actions in The Savage She-Hulk #9–12 and 25. These stories also showed him willing to lend his expertise to help others who suffered from a mutation or "curse" they did not choose. This continued when Morbius is seen researching the condition of the Werewolf (Jack Russell) in West Coast Avengers (vol. 2) #5.

=== 1990s anti-hero ===
Following sporadic appearances over the next decade, Morbius was retooled as part of the 1992 "Rise of the Midnight Sons" crossover event, the purpose of which was to launch a new line of horror- and supernatural-themed comics following the success of Ghost Rider (vol. 3). "Rise of the Midnight Sons" featured the new Ghost Rider (Danny Ketch) and Johnny Blaze (the previous Ghost Rider) seeking out the "Midnight Sons", different unique individuals who would eventually be crucial to stopping the demonic Lilith from laying waste to humanity (as well as potentially other threats just as great). This led directly into the new series Morbius the Living Vampire, which would run for 32 issues (September 1992 – April 1995). Morbius the Living Vampire #1 showed the title character being mutated further, which altered his abilities slightly, revealed that he had untapped "psionic" power, and gave him a more rational, introspective nature. Morbius takes on the role of a lethal vigilante, vowing only to feed on killers who are truly evil and beyond remorse. The next month, Morbius the Living Vampire #2 retroactively explained much of Morbius' villainy in the past as the result of his initial mutation altering his brain and making him "insane", a condition now alleviated with his latest mutation. Morbius also discovers that his blood disease is no longer in remission and is slowly killing him. This introduces an ongoing series sub-plot wherein Morbius and his trusted friend, Dr. Jacob Weisenthal, regularly research treatments and anti-viral serums that may put his blood disease and his condition as a pseudo-vampire both into remission. With his ability to reason restored and his newfound purpose as a vigilante rather than a villain, Morbius is seen creating a new cover identity for himself, that of human hematologist Dr. Morgan Michaels.

Rather than only pitting Morbius against Marvel heroes or previously established villains as had been done in the past, new enemies were introduced and created specifically to fight him. These included Dr. Thaddeus Paine, Basilisk, Vic Slaughter and the Hardcases, Bloodthirst (a demonic presence in Morbius' mind and body who later manifests his own body in issue #20), and Bloodbath. Along with these foes, Morbius the Living Vampire featured recurring appearances by Simon Stroud. Introduced as a rogue CIA agent hunting the Man-Wolf in Creatures on the Loose #37, Stroud had first encountered Morbius in Adventure into Fear #27 and was now determined to end Morbius' life.

To increase awareness and the popularity of Morbius the Living Vampire, a reprint series entitled Morbius Revisited was published from 1992 to 1993. The series featured material originally published in Adventure into Fear #27–31. Along with this, Morbius appeared in short solo stories featured in the anthology series Midnight Sons Unlimited (1993–1995), as well as in Marvel Comics Presents #144, the one-shot Strange Tales: Dark Corners #1 (May 1998), Amazing Fantasy (vol. 2) #17 (March 2006), and the one-shot Legion of Monsters: Morbius #1 (September 2007).

As he was now a vigilante and part of the Midnight Sons, Morbius engaged in several team-ups with heroes and anti-heroes throughout the 1990s and early 2000s. He frequently crossed paths with the sorcerer Doctor Strange as well as the Ghost Rider and the Nightstalkers, a group which included Blade as well as Hannibal King, a "quasi-vampire" who was similar to Morbius in that he tried to curb his bloodlust so as not to compromise his morals but, unlike Morbius, was a true undead vampire rather than a scientific mutation. In Morbius the Living Vampire #12, Blade is possessed by a demon and, against his will, kills Morbius. Morbius is immediately resurrected in Spirits of Vengeance #13.

During the 1993 Marvel Comics crossover event Maximum Carnage, Morbius and his longtime adversary Spider-Man temporarily become uneasy allies to stop a New York City murder spree led by the spree killer Carnage. In Peter Parker: Spider-Man #77–80 (1997), Morbius again teams up with Spider-Man to stop Hydra agent Loxias Crown, who then becomes another pseudo-vampire called the Hunger.

Morbius the Living Vampire series writer Len Kaminski had regular conflicts with series penciller Ron Wagner. The two were collaborators who used the "Marvel method" of comic book scripting, meaning Kaminski would plot out the stories, Wagner would then determine more of the narrative details by illustrating the scenes (potentially adding ones) and creating the narrative pace, after which Kaminski would see the art and any notes Wagner had, then either ask for changes or accept the art and fill in the final dialogue and captions. As time went on, Kaminski claimed Wagner often complained about his stories to the editorial staff and left "snide margin notes [in the art] in which he made his personal opinion of my plots clear." Wagner alleged he expressed concerns Kaminski's stories were too introspective and character-focused when a series about a violent vampire who hunted evil people needed to have more action and bloodshed. According to Kaminski, he was willing to discuss the story and series direction further but Wagner ignored his attempts at contact. Marvel Comics sided with Wagner, replacing Kaminski with issue #9 by asking series colorist Gregory Wright to step in as writer. A one-shot special, tentatively titled Spider-Man/Venom/Morbius was scheduled for 1993, but it was never published due to Kaminski's departure from the series. Wagner remained as series penciler until issue #15, then left as well.

Under writer Gregory Wright, the series Morbius the Living Vampire featured the resurrection of Michael's former lover, Martine Bancroft, in issues #13–17. The story line ended with Martine now alive again due to mystical forces, but no longer able to experience her full range of emotions. Throughout the rest of the series, Martine shifts from supporting character to occasional antagonist as she sometimes clashes with Morbius due to resentment over the circumstances of her resurrection and the pursuit of restoring her emotions sometimes placing other in danger.

Wright stayed as writer on Morbius the Living Vampire until issue #23. Pat Mills wrote issue #24 in 1994, after which Lisa Trusiani took over as series writer. She remained in this role until issue #32, when the series was cancelled due to declining sales and waning fan interest. The series ends with Morbius being mutated once again by an anti-viral serum that saves his life, but results in his now once again losing his ability to reason and experiencing blackouts when his bloodlust is too strong. This leads him to abandon his vigilante life and the double identity of Dr. Morgan Michaels. The final story arc of the series does not resolve whether or not Morbius' blood disease is still killing him, despite his vampiric regenerative abilities, or if the newest anti-viral system has finally put the disease back into remission. It also does not resolve the fact that Martine is left a true undead vampire who is obsessed with Morbius (though this is finally resolved in 2010; see below). Since the series' cancellation, there has been no further depictions of Morbius' 1990s supporting cast of his friend, Jacob Weisenthal, or his love interests, Mandy Tyler and Lena Ivana.

For the next several years, Morbius once again made sporadic appearances as an uneasy ally or outright villain who encountered other superheroes, particularly Spider-Man.

=== 2000s ===
In 2010, Morbius and Martine both appear in The Amazing Spider-Man #622, written by Fred Van Lente and illustrated by Joe Quinones. The story features Martine, having now become a true undead vampire, fighting Morbius and Spider-Man. Morbius ends Martine's life by driving a wooden stake through her heart and then scattering her ashes.

In 2011, the Marvel Comics series Legion of Monsters (vol. 2) featured Morbius, Jack Russell, and other supernatural-themed characters as a loose-knit team hunting more dangerous monsters. Morbius then appeared in the 2011 crossover event "Spider-Island", after which he was seen being incarcerated at the Raft, a prison made for supervillains.

On October 17, 2012, Marvel announced that Morbius would appear in a new comic book series by writer Joe Keatinge and artist Richard Elson. Morbius the Living Vampire (vol. 2) began publication in January 2013. Unlike the 1990s series that featured Morbius as a violent anti-hero, this series referred to him as a "hunted, haunted fugitive", who was now dealing with weakened abilities and mental depression following his escape from the Raft. The series featured the pseudo-vampire protagonist once again attempting to cure himself of his condition while dealing with New York gangs, including the crime lord known as the Rose. It also expanded Morbius' pre-Living Vampire history, revealing more information about his mother and his childhood friendship with Emil Nikos. Morbius the Living Vampire (vol. 2) met with mixed reviews and low sales, and was cancelled after nine issues.

During the 2019 crossover event Absolute Carnage, Morbius was seen as one of several characters opposing the mass murderer Carnage and the Cult of Knull. In late 2019, Morbius starred in a new series, now simply titled Morbius, written by Vita Ayala with art by Marcelo Ferreira, Francisco Mobili, and Roberto Poggi. The series featured several appearances by Spider-Man, as well as new character Elizabeth Nikos, sister of Morbius' friend, scientific collaborator, and then victim Emil Nikos. Although plans and promotions were released for at least eight issues, the series was abruptly put on hiatus after issue #5 when the COVID-19 pandemic forced Marvel Comics to halt or slow down several operations. Rather than continue the series, it was later officially cancelled.

In 2021, Marvel published a one-shot entitled Morbius: Bond of Blood, written by Ralph Macchio, with art by Tom Reilly and Chris O'Halloran. The one-shot featured the first appearance and death of Christos Nikos, son of Emil Nikos.

== Fictional character biography ==
Michael Morbius is born and raised in Greece by his single mother, and experiences a largely isolated childhood due to a rare and fatal blood condition. His only true friend during this time is a boy named Emil Nikos who, like him, is interested in medicine and science. Intellectually gifted, Morbius spends much of his isolation reading and studying. In time, he becomes a highly respected and Nobel Prize-winning biochemist and biologist with a medical degree in hematology. As an adult, Morbius researches a means to cure his own fatal condition, hiring Emil Nikos as his research partner and a beautiful young woman named Martine Bancroft as his office assistant. Martine and Morbius fall in love and become engaged to be married.

After years of research, Morbius attempts a radical cure on himself involving chemical treatments, samples of vampire bat DNA, and electroshock therapy. The experiment puts the blood disease into remission, but radically mutates Morbius into a pseudo-vampire with enhanced abilities. To keep his disease in remission, Morbius must now feed on fresh blood of living humans regularly or risk death. His appearance and personality also shift, making him now prone to bouts of rage, paranoia, and bloodlust. During one of these early bouts of bloodlust and madness, Morbius' first victim is his friend Emil. Horrified by his actions and mutation, Morbius leaves for New York to conduct more research in secret. He encounters the scientist-turned-reptilian monster known as the Lizard and the super-hero Spider-Man, who at the time is dealing with a mutation of his own that has left him with four extra arms. Samples of Morbius' blood leads the Lizard to revert to his human form of Curt Connors and allows Spider-Man to lose his extra limbs. It is discovered that a few of Morbius' victims did not die and are now infected with a form of his own mutation, giving them increased strength and bloodlust but no further superhuman abilities. Morbius and Martine synthesize an antidote for these victims, but the serum does not work on Morbius' own condition. Overtaken by bloodlust, Morbius attacks Martine, turning her into a pseudo-vampire as well. After using their serum to cure her, Morbius flees rather than endanger Martine again.

Morbius eventually leaves New York, moving location frequently to avoid capture. During this time, he rescues Amanda Saint from a Satanic cult known as Demon-Fire, then encounters John Jameson, who at the time is cursed to transform into the Man-Wolf. Alongside the Man-Wolf, Morbius battles Spider-Man again. Later, Morbius encounters Reverend Daemond, the Caretakers of the planet Arcturus IV, the Cat People of the Land Within and Tara the Girlchild, the extra-dimensional demon known as Helleyes, and the Living Eraser. He also meets other monsters, such as the Werewolf (Jack Russell), Ghost Rider (Johnny Blaze), and Man-Thing (Ted Sallis), and superhuman adventurers such as Blade, the original X-Men, and the Human Torch and the Thing, the last two both being members of the Fantastic Four. During this time, he continues to frequently clash with Spider-Man.

Later, Morbius meets rogue CIA agent Simon Stroud and together they fight a group of new pseudo-vampires created by Morbius's bites and resulting infection. One of these pseudo-vampires bites and infects Martine, turning her into a pseudo-vampire as well. Thanks to Morbius' efforts, Martine is cured and the other pseudo-vampires destroyed. Morbius then flees, believing he is still a danger to Martine. After this, he befriends desperate landowner Alicia Twain (later avenging her murder) and battles Morgana St. Clair, an enigmatic vampire expert living in England who is actually a true undead vampire and a member of a Satanic cult of true undead vampires known as the Brotherhood of Judas. Morbius destroys St. Clair and the members of the cult, as well as a priest that was being used by them as a human sacrifice and blood meal at the priest's request. Morbius later enlists help in finding a cure for his pseudo-vampirism from his old friend Ronson Slade, a scientist. Slade, however, becomes a werewolf and Morbius is forced to kill him.

=== Remission ===
During another battle with Spider-Man, Morbius succeeds in feeding on a sample of the hero's radioactive blood. By chance, Morbius is then hit by a lightning bolt at the same time. Morbius survives the lightning strike and discovers he is seemingly human again, his appearance, sanity, and normal human traits restored, though his blood disease has returned and he now requires frequent treatments and blood transfusions. While continuing to research how to stabilize a full cure, Morbius agrees to stand trial for his several crimes over the years and hires attorney Jennifer Walters (whose identity as She-Hulk is not publicly known at the time). Later, Morbius learns of Walters' status as the She-Hulk and that she suffers from sometimes erratic transformations. He gives her a serum based on research regarding his own condition and Walters finds herself now able to change form at will (though with effort). In court, Walters' argues that Morbius' crimes as a pseudo-vampire were due in large part to his "medical condition" affecting his ability to reason, while adding that most of Morbius' victims survived and were cured of pseudo-vampirism by the biochemist himself. Taking this into account, the court finds Morbius guilty of involuntary manslaughter rather than murder.

For the next few years of his life, Morbius continues to research his disease while acting as a consultant to others. He becomes a closer friend to the Werewolf (Jack Russell) and offers information to the Avengers that helps them on a case. Eventually, despite all of his efforts, Morbius reverts to being a pseudo-vampire again. Working alongside several allies, the sorcerer Doctor Strange is able to use the Montesi Formula (a spell found in the Darkhold) to banish all true undead vampires from Earth's dimension. Morbius is unaffected since he is a scientific mutation and not a supernatural creature. The only other vampire to be unaffected is Hannibal King, a true undead vampire and detective who refused to feed on humans and was spared from the spell's effects. Years later, alongside the sorcerers Doctor Strange and Brother Voodoo, Morbius battles Marie Laveau and witnesses the return of true undead vampires to Earth.

Frustrated by his repeated failures to cure himself, Morbius takes refuge in the sewers of New York City and discovers a community of underground dwellers who offer to help him in exchange for protection. The community brings Morbius "bad ones" to feed on and Morbius believes from their descriptions that these people brought to him are killers themselves. After feeding on several victims, Morbius is confronted by Spider-Man, who accuses him of becoming a serial killer. Discovering the underground community deems anyone living on the surface to be a "bad one", Morbius is horrified to realize he has murdered people at random. Disgusted with himself, Morbius flees into the sewers and falls deeper into depression.

=== The Midnight Sons ===
Soon after Spider-Man and Morbius' confrontation in the sewers, Johnny Blaze and the new Ghost Rider (whose human host is Danny Ketch) learn that Lilith has returned to Earth and intends to lay waste to humanity with help from her children and descendants, Lilin. Ghost Rider experiences a vision of several individuals who together can oppose Lilith, an alliance known as "the Nine" or "the Midnight Sons". Seeing that Morbius is one of the Midnight Sons, the Ghost Rider and Blaze track him down with the aid of Martine Bancroft and her ally, Dr. David Langford, a biochemist she hopes can cure Morbius at last. Secretly, Langford is working with a villainous scientist named Dr. Thaddeus Paine who intends to kill Morbius and then conduct research on his mutated body; Langford's "cure" will actually simply kill. Not knowing this, and wishing to sabotage the effort to help Morbius, Lilith sends one of her Lilin to use their own demonic Lilin blood to poison Langford's serum.

After a brief battle with the Ghost Rider and Blaze, Morbius is subdued and taken to Langford's lab, where he is given the phony cure. The result of Langford's serum mixed with demonic Lilin blood creates a new mutagenic agent, altering Morbius' abilities and appearance while also largely restoring his sanity and his true personality. Confused by his new state, Morbius seeks out his old friend and colleague, Dr. Jacob Weisenthal, a general practitioner. Meanwhile, Martine discovers Langford's treachery and he kills her. Morbius arrives moments later, feeding on Langford and then realizing he feels no guilt over ending the life of a corrupt and remorseless killer. When the Ghost Rider and Blaze arrive on the scene, Morbius explains the situation and vows he is not an enemy of the innocent. From now on, if he must feed on living people, it will be "the blood of the guilty", villains "who deserve to die". The Ghost Rider accepts this, warning Morbius that this vow may not be easy to follow. Days later, Morbius and the other Midnight Sons hold their first official alliance meeting and join forces against Lilith. Despite his agreement to fight Lilith, Morbius is immediately looked on with suspicion by the Midnight Sons known as the Nightstalkers, a trio of vampire hunters and occult investigators that includes Hannibal King (whose true undead vampirism has returned), the dhampir (or "half-vampire") Blade, and Frank Drake, the last living mortal descendant of Dracula.

Over the next year, Morbius confronts several new foes, including Dr. Paine, Basilisk (Wayne Gifford), Vic Slaughter, Bloodthirst, and Bloodbath. During the initial battle with the bounty hunter Vic Slaughter and his team of mercenaries the Hardcases, Martine Bancroft's tombstone is damaged by gunfire. Enraged, Morbius kills the Hardcases and drains Slaughter of some blood, but then buries the villain alive rather than killing him outright. Morbius leaves, believing his bite no longer infects people with partial pseudo-vampirism. Morbius then later discovers that if he drains a certain amount of blood from a victim, the infection of his bite is actually more powerful than it was before. Vic Slaughter rises from near-death as a new pseudo-vampire, his powers and abilities equal to those of Morbius.

Despite not being trusted by many of them, Morbius continues to join the Midnight Sons in battles against evil whenever they need his help. He also aids Spider-Man, Venom, the Black Cat and other superheroes against a gang of supervillains led by spree killers Carnage and Shriek during the crossover event called Maximum Carnage. During a battle with the dream-empowered demon Nightmare, Morbius learns that his new mutation due to demon blood has made him immortal in the traditional sense, meaning he can die from injury but no longer ages. Soon afterward, Blade is bitten by Morbius and temporarily becomes a true undead vampire called Switchblade. He kills several allies, including Morbius. Soon afterward, Blade is cured of his vampirism and his victims are magically restored back to life, including Morbius.

From Dr. Paine, Morbius learns that his blood disease is not in full remission and will still eventually kill him despite constantly feeding on fresh blood and his otherwise impressive regenerative abilities. With help from Jacob Weisenthal, Morbius researches how to at least alleviate his condition if a cure is impossible. With newly obtained samples of Spider-Man's radioactive blood, Morbius and Weisenthal create an "anti-viral" serum that restores his human form for several hours at a time. Now able to operate for part of the day as a normal man, Morbius creates the cover identity of Dr. Morgan Michaels and attains a job as a hematologist at St. Jude's Memorial Hospital in New York. As a hematologist, Morbius is able to steal collected blood donations to briefly alleviate his bloodlust in between feeding on living people, although the preservatives and anti-coagulants used with donated blood means it will poison Morbius if he ingests too much of it. He also attains a hyperbolic chamber and dialysis equipment, allowing him to oxygenate his blood and cleanse his system as he sleeps.

Jack Russell tracks Morbius to St. Jude's Hospital, offering to help the man learn how to live with his newest mutation rather than attempt to fight it. Morbius refuses this viewpoint, arguing that being a pseudo-vampire is a curse he should not accept. Later, fearing his condition is worsening, Morbius attempts to cure himself with "necro-technology" used by the Nightstalkers, but this fails. Morbius also attempts feeding on the blood of the true undead vampire and detective Hannibal King to see if it satisfies his bloodlust, only to discover that his body simply rejects vampire blood because it is "lifeless".

At the hospital, Morbius meets, and is romantically pursued by, Mandy Tyler, the executive administrative assistant of the hospital's hematology department. Mandy later learns of Morbius' true nature and tells him she accepts it. On a date, Mandy reveals she is part of a private fetish club whose members emulate true undead vampires by drinking blood. Morbius meets the club's leader, Brian DeWolff. Formerly the vigilante called Wraith, DeWolff is secretly using his psionic powers to turn the club members into followers who will perform terrorist acts against the NYPD. With the help of the cyborg Deathlok, Morbius halts the "vampire cult" from committing a terrorist bombing and then seemingly kills DeWolff.

Thanks to traces of Lilin blood still in Morbius' body, the spirit of a Lilin called Bloodthirst begins guiding Morbius' mind. Bloodthirst influences Morbius to use the Darkhold, a book of corrupt magic, to resurrect Martine Bancroft. Morbius then realizes this was a scheme by the Lilin, who use Martine's body so that one of their own, a being called Parasite, may now have a body. Bloodthirst then takes full possession of Morbius' body and attacks the Midnight Sons with the help of Martine/Parasite. With help from Doctor Strange, Morbius reasserts control over his own body. To defeat Parasite, Morbius then kills Martine's body, forcing the Lilin spirit out of her so it can be destroyed. Later, Martine's true spirit is revived and restored to her body, but the resurrection process leaves her a true undead vampire, unable to feel touch. She also claims to lack her full ability to experience emotions, including the love she used to have for Morbius. Martine moves into Morbius' home, but becomes frustrated by her new condition. Soon afterward, Morbius expels the traces of Lilin blood in his body so that Bloodthirst cannot influence him further. Bloodthirst is able to manifest a new body of a true undead vampire for himself and seriously injures both Jacob and Mandy before Morbius finally destroys him. Morbius decides to distance himself from Mandy to protect her.

Morbius later encounters Lena Ivana, a woman kidnapped from her home in Eastern Europe and then forced into sex work in New York City. After freeing her, Morbius becomes enamored with Lena. In contrast, she fears Morbius after seeing how quickly he kills criminals. Despite this, Morbius hopes to see her again and he suggests to Lena that she seeks medical treatment from "Dr. Morgan Michaels". Unaware this is the pseudo-vampire who frightens her, Lena finds herself drawn to Dr. Michaels. Lena then takes a job at St. Jude's Memorial Hospital as well, working in the morgue and seeing Dr. Michaels often.

Martine becomes obsessed with having her humanity restored, accusing her former lover of stealing her emotions and dismissing her from his life. Morbius points out that Martine's changed attitude and lack of love for him cannot be due to a lack of emotions because she clearly feels anger, resentment, hope, frustration, and envy. Though he promises to continue searching for a way to cure her of being a true undead vampire, he says that he and Martine cannot resume a relationship due to their feelings for each other changing. After fighting Morbius and then hurling herself through a window, Martine leaves him but rents a nearby apartment so she can continue spying on her former lover. She then begins a casual romantic relationship with Jack Russell.

=== Return of the monster ===
Lena Ivana's influence leads Morbius to reconsider his vow to only feed on the guilty, realizing he does not investigate his criminal victims enough to fully realize if they are in need of help or can be reformed. He decides it is better to abstain from feeding and simply allow himself to die rather than continue to justify murder. Realizing his friend intends to commit suicide, Jack Russell confronts Morbius and they fight each other. Weakened by the fight and a lack of blood for several days, Morbius is then exposed to the rising sun and quickly burns. Jacob Weisenthal arrives and administers his latest attempt at a cure for Morbius' mutation, but the pseudo-vampire seemingly dies. Jacob and Jack Russell arrange for a midnight burial attended by the Midnight Sons, Martine, and Lena. Possibly thanks to Jacob's latest anti-viral serum, Morbius suddenly heals and regains consciousness, rising from his grave.

As a result of Jacob's serum, Morbius seems to lose his bloodlust and only temporarily achieves a partial pseudo-vampiric appearance every night at midnight. Jacob becomes alarmed that Morbius is experiencing blackouts again and may be feeding without realizing it, but Michael insists he is cured and continues pursuing Lena romantically. Enraged with jealousy, Martine meets with Lena and tells her that "Dr. Morgan Michaels" is actually Dr. Michael Morbius, alias Morbius the Living Vampire. Feeling betrayed, Lena leaves Morbius. Morbius then realizes he is experiencing bloodlust again and losing his reason as he regains his full pseudo-vampiric appearance. After blacking out, Morbius realizes he has attacked and fed on a random person. Jacob's latest "cure" has only made him once again a monster who loses all reason and sanity when he feels the need to feed, no longer able to maintain any kind of morality or any vow to only feed on the "blood of the guilty". Driven by his bloodlust and once again a danger to everyone around him, Morbius abandons his identity of Dr. Morgan Michaels and leaves behind both Jacob and St. Jude's Memorial Hospital. Although Jacob's serum did not cure his pseudo-vampirism, it evidently put his blood disease back into remission, as it is never mentioned again that the disease is still killing him.

Once again a fugitive, Morbius escapes detection for some time while occasionally clashing with Spider-Man. An encounter with the mutant Nate Grey leads Morbius' hunger to temporarily increase. Frightened that his condition is worsening, Morbius seeks out help from hematologist Dr. Andrea Janson. Before he can be helped, he is captured and tortured by Hydra agent Loxias Crown. He then assists both Spider-Man and S.H.O.C. against the terrorist organization and drains Crown of blood before leaving him for dead. Rather than die, Crown becomes a new pseudo-vampire called the Hunger and creates a cult of pseudo-vampire followers. Later, Morbius is kidnapped and biologically engineered to be more powerful so he can oppose the Hunger. He is freed by Spider-Man and Blade, but the identity of who kidnapped and experimented on him is never revealed.

Years later, the Superhuman Registration Act is passed, obligating anyone with superhuman abilities to register with S.H.I.E.L.D. and comply with its authority. For a time, Morbius submits to the SRA and joins an effort to capture Blade. Later, during an invasion from the Marvel Zombies universe of Earth-2149, Morbius is seen as a member of A.R.M.O.R. and fights a zombie version of himself. Shortly afterward, Morbius forms a new version of the Midnight Sons with Jennifer Kale, Daimon Hellstrom, Jack Russell and Man-Thing. Together, they contain a zombie outbreak on an isolated island, briefly encountering the Hood in the process. Morbius also helps Man-Thing revive the Punisher (Frank Castle) into the monster called Franken-Castle.

When Morbius concludes that Spider-Man's blood cells may help cure Jack Russell of his lycanthropy, he steals samples of Spider-Man's blood. Spider-Man learns Morbius is behind the theft from Martine Bancroft, who is still a true undead vampire. The hero finds Morbius and Martine arrives, declaring once more her desire to reunite with her former lover and offering to kill his frequent enemy Spider-Man as proof of her love. Morbius refuses to endanger Spider-Man and argues that Martine's feeling for him is only a longing for completion because her soul has not been intact since her resurrection. Seeing that Spider-Man cannot bring himself to kill even a vampire, Morbius takes action himself and kills Martine with a wooden stake driven through her heart, causing her body to disintegrate to ashes that are then scattered. Despite their history as enemies, the Web-Slinger voluntarily donates more blood samples to Morbius to aid him in his research.

After briefly working with Doctor Octopus, Morbius accepts an offer to become a researcher at Horizon Labs, given access to advanced equipment in exchange for sharing his research with company head Max Modell. To keep his identity hidden from the other researchers who may not approve of this, Morbius stays hidden and is referred to only as Number Six, since he occupies Lab 6. Peter Parker later learns the truth of Number Six's identity during the "Spider-Island" affair. Morbius is later confronted by the authorities and taken to the supervillain prison known as the Raft, but escapes during a large-scale breakout. Taking refuge in the neighborhood of Brownsville, he becomes a local protector, leading to confrontations with the newest criminal to call himself the Rose (Phillip Hayes). During this time, he develops a friendship with Bucky Barnes and encounters his long-estranged father, Makarioa Morbius.

During a journey to Barcelona, Morbius is captured by local true undead vampires. He then joins forces with Domino, Diamondback and Outlaw to defeat them before Domino helps him escape a vampire hunter. Morbius later becomes involved in a Vampire Civil War and is rescued from Dracula's disciples by Wasp and Man-Wolf. When the spree killer Carnage and the Cult of Knull threaten humanity, Morbius joins the efforts to oppose them. Later, Morbius is hunted by Elizabeth Nikos, the sister of his longtime friend, scientific collaborator and first victim Emil Nikos. Not long after this, Morbius also meets Emil's son, Christos Nikos, who hopes that Morbius' genetics may cure him of his own fatal illness. These efforts fail and Christos dies.

During the "Beyond" storyline, Morbius briefly fights the new Spider-Man (Ben Reilly, a clone of Peter Parker) before fleeing. After taking a sample of Reilly's blood, which is identical to Parker's on a cellular level, Morbius realizes Spider-Man's radioactive blood will no longer work in creating even a temporary cure for his pseudo-vampirism. After being taken to the Beyond Corporation's secret facility on Staten Island, Morbius' genetic template is used to help create Creature Z, a "binary clone" of Morbius and Lizard. Morbius helps Misty Knight and Colleen Wing fight Creature Z and destroys it with his own blood.

During the "Blood Hunt" storyline, Morbius was working on a vampire cure for Misty Knight when he and Colleen Wing were captured by vampires who were operating a Beyond Foods truck. After breaking out, Morbius and Wing explore the facility and take an elevator to Floor Z4, where they find a floor filled with vampires. There is a fight among them until their leader, Theocratis, breaks it up and subdues Wing. As Wing is taken to the pens, Morbius is told by Theocratis that he is in his start-up company, Hemoglobin Inc., where Theocratis wants Morbius to work on the vampire cure once and for all.

== Powers and abilities ==
Before he contracted the disease of pseudo-vampirism, Michael Morbius already possessed a genius-level intellect. He is an M.D. with a Ph.D in biochemistry. A biologist specializing in hematology, Michael Morbius is an expert radiologist and a Nobel laureate. His own condition as a pseudo-vampire and his frequent studies of superhumans such as Spider-Man, the She-Hulk, Martine Bancroft (when she was resurrected as a true undead vampire), and the Werewolf (Jack Russell) have made him an authority on superhuman mutation, including those influenced by supernatural or magical forces.

Experimental procedures have turned Michael Morbius into a pseudo-vampire or living vampire. As opposed to a true undead vampire who is re-animated by supernatural forces, Morbius is still a living being with no inherent supernatural or magical energies (though he has at times been temporarily affected or tainted by demonic forces). As such, his abilities, traits and weaknesses are similar to, but do not exactly align with, those of true undead vampires that inhabit the Marvel Universe.

Morbius' senses are somewhat enhanced, granting him greater hearing, taste and smell, as well as night vision. His talons are able to easily tear through flesh, bone, and wood (though not metal or concrete). Morbius' mutation has altered and increased the strength of his skeleton, as well as his muscle tissue. He has superhuman strength. allowing him to lift nearly two tons of weight. He has resistance to physical injury a few times greater than that of an average human being, making it more difficult to burn him, pierce his organs or break his bones.

Morbius has advanced regenerative abilities (though his healing factor is not as strong as that of Dracula, the Lord of the Vampires or the mutant Wolverine). Given time, he can recover from many and multiple wounds that would be fatal for a normal human being. Bullet wounds can be fully healed in hours, while more severe damage such as broken bones, major damage to organs and severe burns may take a few days to recover from (drinking fresh blood from living humans will also enhance his cellular regeneration). If the injuries are severe enough and he is not given time to heal before further injury or is unable to ingest sufficient blood in due time, he will succumb to his wounds and die. Morbius has also concluded that he would be unable to regenerate lost limbs and organs if they were completely destroyed.

Morbius has psionic abilities that allow him to hypnotize others. The strength of this hypnosis varies from person to person, allowing Morbius to either influence them subtly or alter their short-term memory of a recent event. Some people, such as those who are aware of Morbius' hypnotic abilities, seem more resistant to this power. Morbius' psionic power also allows for a limited telekinetic-like ability that allows him to glide on air currents and aids him in climbing surfaces such as walls. While gliding, his top speed is believed to be roughly 35 mph.

Morbius has often used specialized clothing to aid him. His original costume had bat-like cloth wings attached underneath the sleeves to aid him in gliding. He later wore a reinforced leather outfit to provide extra protection in battle. Later on, he used Horizon Labs resources to develop personal body armor.

Most of Morbius' victims die from blood loss, even those he does not drain completely. On rare occasion, Morbius' bite has infected a victim with a mutation similar but weaker to his own, giving them some enhanced strength and a desire for blood, but no psionic or healing abilities. This occurred with his former fiancé Martine Bancroft, as well as the characters Jefferson Bolt (seen in Marvel Team-Up #3), Emilio (seen in Peter Parker, the Spectacular Spider-Man #7), Nate Grey (in X-Man #24), and a homeless woman named Roxy (Legion of Monsters: Morbius #1). When Morbius was temporarily infected by demonic Lilin blood, his bite caused the bounty hunter Vic Slaughter to become another pseudo-vampire with near-equal powers and abilities to his. On one occasion, Morbius bit Blade, who is himself a dhampir (or "half-vampire"), a being halfway between being a vampire and a normal human being, and the result was that Blade temporarily became a true undead vampire named Switchblade.

While he was temporarily infected by demonic Lilin blood, Morbius was able to collapse his body into a near-liquid, putty-like state that allowed him to pass through cracks in doors and other barriers. He lost this ability after he expelled the Lilin blood from his body.

== Weaknesses ==
As he is not a true undead vampire, Morbius is unaffected by religious symbols or objects considered holy and he is not affected by wood or silver more than other metals or substances that may damage his body. While he is vulnerable to direct sunlight, he will not be reduced to ashes by it as happens with true undead vampires. Instead, Morbius' skin will take several minutes to blister and burn and it will take several minutes more before he risks being overwhelmed by pain and dehydration. If he is weakened, the burns may become more severe more rapidly, killing him after only a few minutes. Even if he is not in direct sunlight, ambient radiation from the sun weakens his abilities and health unless he is properly protected by lead or concrete barriers.

To keep his blood disease from returning at an accelerated rate that will quickly kill him, Morbius must regularly feed on fresh blood from living humans. He does not require blood on a daily basis, but his need does increase the longer he goes without blood or if he is injured or engages in strenuous activity. Throughout his life since his mutation, Morbius has often been vulnerable to losing all reason and moral inhibitions when he is overwhelmed by his bloodlust, causing him to feed and not realize his own actions until minutes later.

True undead vampires in the Marvel Universe are sometimes able to survive by draining blood from non-human animals, recently deceased humans or even other true undead vampires if the situation is such that living humans are not immediately available (the true undead vampire and detective Hannibal King survived for a time by feeding on the blood of the recently buried dead). Morbius, however, is completely unable to be nourished from these same sources and must drink only fresh blood from living humans in order to satisfy his bloodlust. As a stop-gap, Morbius has used collected blood from blood banks when he is desperate enough to keep his bloodlust at bay; however, the chemical preservatives and anti-coagulants used by blood banks make donated blood a poor source of nourishment for Morbius and it will poison him if he ingests such samples regularly or in great enough quantities.

On more than one occasion, Spider-Man's radioactive blood (used in tandem with electricity or other chemical agents) has put Morbius' pseudo-vampiric mutation into remission for hours or even years at a time, leaving him a non-powered human being with normal human vulnerabilities. On a few occasions, however, Morbius has been greatly injured while in his human form and, instead of dying, the shock of the injuries has triggered his pseudo-vampiric form and abilities to immediately return.

== Reception ==
=== Accolades ===
- In 2014, IGN ranked Morbius 19th in their "Top 25 Spider-Man Villains" list.
- In 2014, WhatCulture ranked Morbius 2nd in their "7 Unused Spider-Man Villains Who'd Be Great in the Marvel Cinematic Universe" list.
- In 2015, Den of Geek ranked Morbius 10th in their "Marvel’s 31 Best Monsters" list.
- In 2019, Comic Book Resources (CBR) ranked Morbius 17th in their "25 Deadliest Spider-Man Villains" list.
- In 2020, CBR ranked Morbius 4th in their "Marvel: Dark Spider-Man Villains, Ranked from Lamest to Coolest" list.
- In 2021, CBR ranked Morbius 4th in their "10 Best Spider-Man Villains Missing from No Way Home" list.
- In 2021, Screen Rant included Michael Morbius in their "Marvel: 10 Most Powerful Vampires" list.
- In 2022, CBR ranked Morbius 1st in their "10 Best Members of Marvel's Legion of Monsters" list and 10th in their "Scariest Comic Book Vampires" list.
- In 2022, CBR ranked Morbius 3rd in their "10 Most Important Marvel Vampires" list.
- In 2022, Screen Rant included Morbius in their "10 Best Marvel Characters Who Made Their Debut In Spider-Man Comics" list.

== Other versions ==
Various alternate universe versions of Morbius have appeared throughout the character's publication history.

=== Earth-14512 ===
In Earth-14512, the home universe of Peni Parker, M.O.R.B.I.U.S. is a robotic dragon-like kaiju that feeds on technology.

=== Earth-31913 ===
In Earth-31913, Morbius gained his powers from an elixir created by an Apache shaman. In his efforts to find a cure, he kidnaps and experiments on several people before realizing the harm he is causing and sacrificing himself to save Web-Slinger.

=== Infinity Warps ===
Michael Morpheus, a composite character based on Morbius and Morpheus, appears in Infinity Wars.

=== Ultimate Marvel ===
In the Ultimate Marvel universe, Morbius is the brother of Vlad the Impaler.

== In other media ==
=== Television ===
- Morbius appears in Spider-Man: The Animated Series, voiced by Nick Jameson. This version is a biologist at Empire State University who can drain blood plasma through his hands, leaving victims with a series of welts covering their bodies. In the episode "The Vampire Queen", Morbius becomes a hero after joining forces with Spider-Man, Blade, and the Black Cat to defeat Miriam and leaves with Blade and the Black Cat to hunt vampires.
- Morbius appears in Ultimate Spider-Man, voiced by Benjamin Diskin. This version is a Hydra scientist who specializes in symbiotes, created Anti-Venom and Carnage, and was transformed into a pseudo-vampire by Doctor Octopus.

=== Film ===
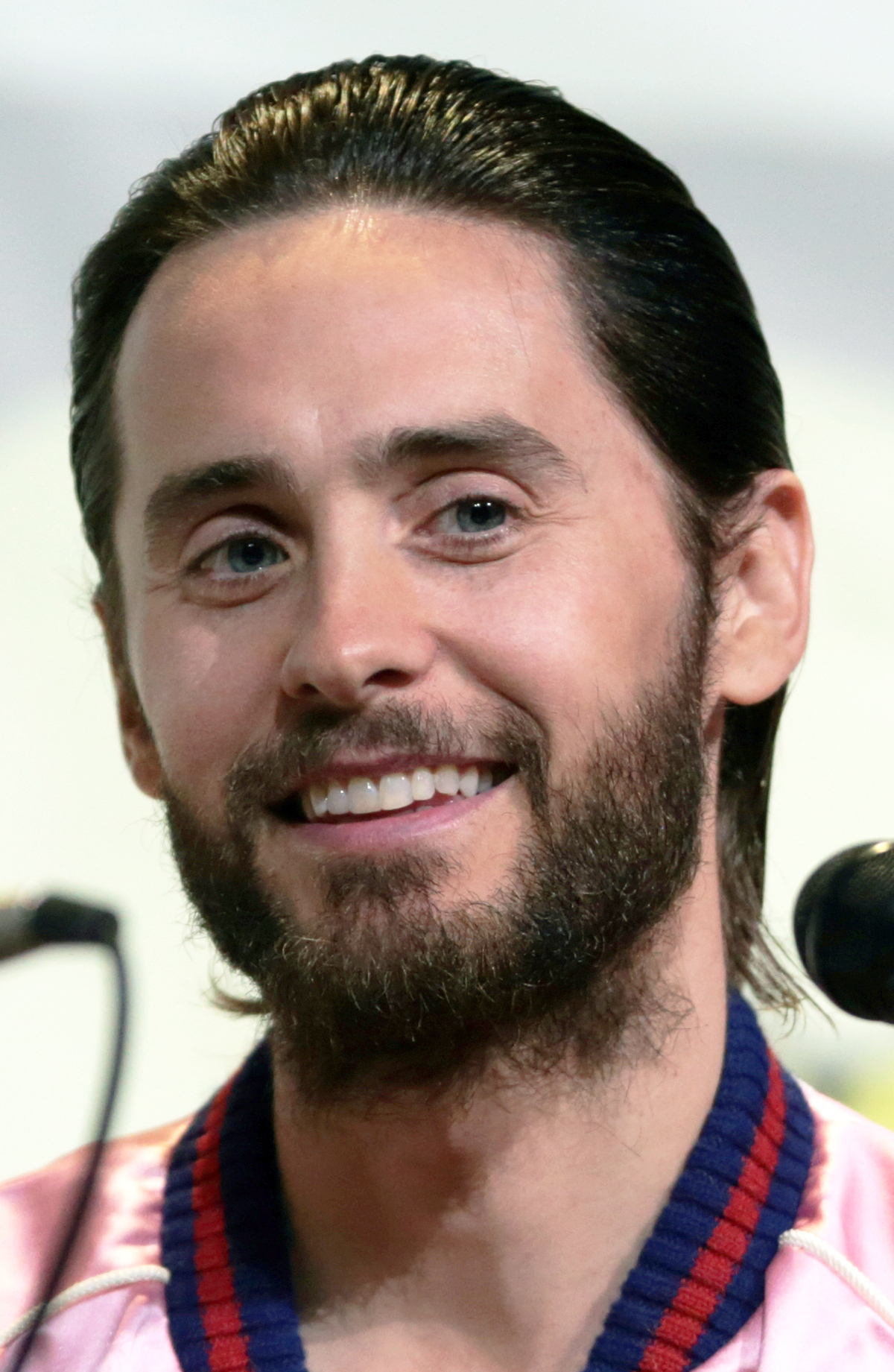
Morbius was played by Jared Leto in Sony's 2022 film adaptation

- Morbius makes a cameo appearance in a deleted scene from Blade, portrayed by director Stephen Norrington.
- In 2000, Marvel Entertainment entered a joint venture agreement with Artisan Entertainment to turn at least 15 Marvel superhero franchises into films, television series, direct-to-video films, and internet projects. These franchises included an adaptation of Morbius.
- In November 2017, Sony Pictures announced plans to make a film adaptation as part of Sony's Spider-Man Universe (SSU), written by Matt Sazama and Burk Sharpless, directed by Daniel Espinosa, and starring Jared Leto as Dr. Michael Morbius. Production began in November 2018. Filming began in February 2019. Additionally, Charlie Shotwell portrays young Michael. Morbius was originally scheduled to be released on January 28, 2022, before it was pushed back to April 1, 2022.
  - A composite character partly inspired by the Hunger along with Emil Nikos, Vic Slaughter, and Michael Morbius, legally named Lucien but primarily known as Milo Morbius, also appears in Morbius, portrayed by Matt Smith as an adult and Joseph Esson as a child.

=== Video games ===
- Morbius appears as a non-playable character (NPC) in Spider-Man and Venom: Maximum Carnage.
- Morbius appears as a boss in the Wii, PS2, and PSP versions of Spider-Man 3, voiced by Sean Donnellan. This version is married to Shriek, who was unwittingly responsible for the lab accident that transformed him into a pseudo-vampire. In a side mission, Spider-Man and Curt Connors work on curing Morbius's pseudo-vampirism.
- Morbius appears as a playable character in Marvel Super Hero Squad Online, voiced by Tom Kenny.
- Morbius appears as an unlockable character in Marvel Avengers Alliance.
- Morbius appears as a playable character in Spider-Man Unlimited.
- Morbius appears as a playable character in Lego Marvel Super Heroes 2.
- Elements of Morbius are incorporated into Dr. Michaels, an original character who appears in Marvel's Spider-Man, voiced by Phil Morris. He is the former chief scientist of Oscorp who contributed to the creation of the bioweapon Devil's Breath and helps Spider-Man create a cure for it.
- Morbius appears as a downloadable playable character in Marvel Ultimate Alliance 3: The Black Order, voiced by Jake Green.
- Morbius appears as a downloadable playable character in Marvel's Midnight Suns.

=== Miscellaneous ===
Michael Morbius appears in the newspaper strip The Amazing Spider-Man. He returns to New York, seemingly cured of his pseudo-vampirism, and with a fiancé, Martine Bancroft. However, at night, he begins exhibiting his old symptoms and comes into conflict with Spider-Man. It is later revealed that Bancroft is behind his troubles and gained her own vampiric abilities after she was attacked and killed by Dracula.

== Collected editions ==
Title	Material collected	Publication date	ISBN
Morbius the Living Vampire: The Man Called Morbius	Morbius the Living Vampire (vol. 2) #1–9; The Amazing Spider-Man #699.1	5 Nov 2013	978-0785183914
Morbius the Living Vampire: Old Wounds	Morbius #1–5	9 March 2020	978-1302920999
Morbius: Preludes and Nightmares	The Amazing Spider-Man #101–102; Marvel Team-Up #3–4; Adventure into Fear #20; The Amazing Spider-Man #699.1	24 Nov 2020	978-1302925925
Marvel-Verse: Morbius	The Amazing Spider-Man #101–102; Marvel Two-in-One #15; Morbius: Bond of Blood #1; material from Spider-Man Family #5	4 Jan 2022	978-1302933678

=== Marvel Epic Collections ===
#	Title	Years covered	Issues collected	Pages	Released	ISBN
1	Morbius: The Living Vampire	1971-1975	Amazing Spider-Man #101–102; Marvel Team-Up #3–4; Giant-Size Super-Heroes #1; Adventure Into Fear #20-26; material from Vampire Tales #1-5, 7-8; Giant-Size Werewolf #4	432	23 Feb 2021	978-1302928353
2	Morbius: The End of a Living Vampire	1975-1981	Adventure Into Fear #27–31; Marvel Premiere #28; Marvel Two-in-One #15; Peter Parker, the Spectacular Spider-Man #6–8, 38; Savage She-Hulk #9–12; material from Vampire Tales #10–11, Super Annual #1 (front cover only); Marvel Preview #8	400	25 May 2021	978-1302928346

=== Marvel Omnibuses ===
Title	Material collected	Publication date	ISBN
Morbius the Living Vampire Omnibus	The Amazing Spider-Man #101–102; Marvel Team-Up #3–4; Giant-Size Super Heroes #1; Adventure into Fear #20–31; Giant-Size Werewolf #4; Marvel Premiere #28; Marvel Two-in-One #15; Peter Parker, the Spectacular Spider-Man #6–8, 38; The Savage She-Hulk #9–12; material from Vampire Tales #1–5, 7–8, 10–11, Super Annual #1 (front cover only) and Marvel Preview #8, plus extras	7 July 2020	978-1302922405

== Books ==
Title	Author	Publisher	Publication date	ISBN
Morbius the Living Vampire: Blood Ties – A Novel of the Marvel Universe	Brendan Deneen	Titan Books	9 March 2021	978-1789094855
