= Kathleen Brooks =

American author

- Education: Centre College; University of Kentucky College of Law
- Occupation: Author
- Writing career
- Genre: Fiction
- Website: kathleen-brooks.com

Kathleen Brooks is an American author of more than thirty titles. She is a multiple New York Times, Wall Street Journal, and USA Today bestselling author of romantic suspense and mystery books.

== Biography ==
Brooks was raised in Nicholasville, Kentucky. She received her B.A. from Centre College and then her J.D. from the University of Kentucky College of Law. She was in private practice before becoming a full-time writer.

Brooks lives in Kentucky with her husband, daughter, and two dogs. She is active in raising money for non-profits that support animals.

== Bibliography ==
=== Bluegrass series ===
- Bluegrass State of Mind ISBN 9780988210806 (June, 2011)
- Risky Shot ISBN 9780988210813 (September, 2011)
- Dead Heat ISBN 9780988210820 (December, 2011)

=== Bluegrass Brothers series ===
- Bluegrass Undercover ISBN 9780988210837 (March, 2012)
- Rising Storm ISBN 9780988210844 (August, 2012)
- Secret Santa ISBN 9781481032582 (November, 2012)
- Acquiring Trouble ISBN 9780988210851 (January, 2013)
- Relentless Pursuit ISBN 9780988210868 (May, 2013)
- Secrets Collide ISBN 9780988210882 (October, 2013)
- Final Vow ISBN 9780988210899 (January, 2014)
- All Hung Up ISBN 9780991397334 (October, 2014)
- Bluegrass Dawn ISBN 9780991397341 (November, 2014)
- The Perfect Gift ISBN 9780991397372 (June, 2015)
- The Keeneston Roses ISBN 9780991397396 (August, 2015)

=== Forever Bluegrass series ===
- Forever Entangled ISBN 9781943805006 (October, 2015)
- Forever Hidden ISBN 9781943805013 (January, 2016)
- Forever Betrayed ISBN 9781943805020 (May, 2016)
- Forever Driven ISBN 9781943805044 (July, 2016)
- Forever Secret ISBN 9781943805105 (January, 2017)
- Forever Surprised ISBN 9781973947356 (July, 2017)
- Forever Concealed ISBN 9781943805129 (September, 2017)
- Forever Devoted ISBN 9781943805174 (January, 2018)
- Forever Hunted ISBN 9781943805181 (May, 2018)
- Forever Guarded ISBN 9781943805198 (July, 2018)

=== Shadows Landing series ===
- Saving Shadows ISBN 9781943805204 (October, 2018)

=== Web of Lies series ===
- Whispered Lies ISBN 9781943805099 (October, 2016)
- Rogue Lies ISBN 9781943805112 (May, 2017)
- Shattered Lies ISBN 9781943805150 (October, 2017)

=== Women of Power series ===
- Chosen for Power ISBN 9780991397303 (April, 2014)
- Built for Power ISBN 9780991397327 (September, 2014)
- Fashioned for Power ISBN 9780991397358 (January, 2015)
- Destined for Power ISBN 9780991397365 (March, 2015)
