= List of songs recorded by Thirty Seconds to Mars =

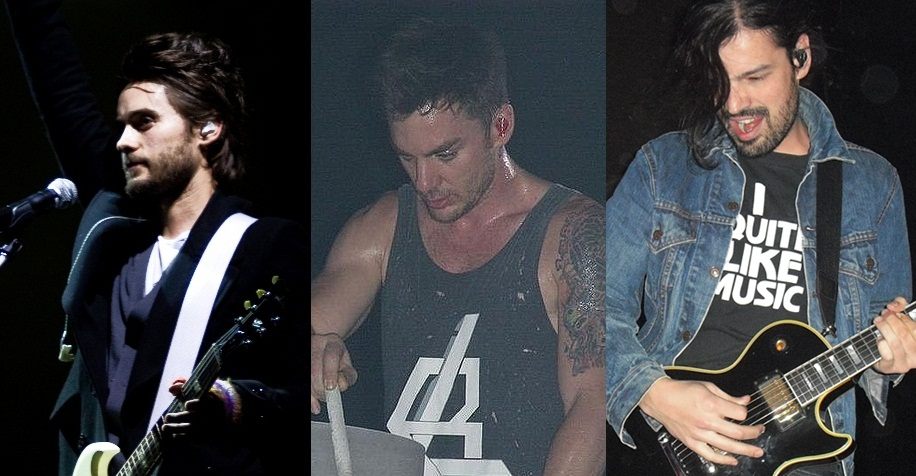
Thirty Seconds to Mars (left to right): Jared Leto, Shannon Leto, Tomo Miličević

American rock band Thirty Seconds to Mars has recorded material for five studio albums. The band was formed in Los Angeles, California, in 1998 by brothers Jared and Shannon Leto. The duo later expanded to a four-piece when they added guitarist Solon Bixler and bassist Matt Wachter to the line-up. After signing a contract with record label Immortal Records in 1998, the band began to work with producers Bob Ezrin and Brian Virtue on their debut album, 30 Seconds to Mars, which was released in August 2002. The album produced two singles, "Capricorn (A Brand New Name)" and "Edge of the Earth". In early 2003, Bixler left the band due to issues primarily related to touring and was replaced by Tomo Miličević. Thirty Seconds to Mars released their second studio album, A Beautiful Lie, in August 2005. The record, produced by Josh Abraham, was preceded by the single "Attack" and spawned two Kerrang! Award-winning singles, "The Kill" and "From Yesterday". The album's title track, "A Beautiful Lie", was released as the fourth single in selected territories. "Hunter", a song originally performed by Björk, was covered by the band and added to the track listing of the album. In March 2007, Wachter left the group to spend more time with his family and was replaced by Tim Kelleher, performing live only.

Thirty Seconds to Mars returned to the studio in August 2008 to begin work on their third album This Is War (2009), with Flood and Steve Lillywhite producing. "Kings and Queens", the album's lead single, was written by Jared Leto across the United States and South Africa. "This Is War" became the band's third number one single on the US Alternative Songs. "Closer to the Edge" was released as the album's third single. Thirty Seconds to Mars collaborated with rapper Kanye West on the song "Hurricane", which was released on the deluxe edition of This Is War and became the album's fourth single in some territories. Drummer Shannon Leto wrote the instrumental track "L490" and played every instrument on it, including all guitars and a singing bowl. This Is War moved away from the band's typical sound to experiment with different musical genres; a trend which became much more pronounced on the 2013 album Love, Lust, Faith and Dreams, produced by Jared Leto with previous collaborator Steve Lillywhite. The first single released from the album was "Up in the Air", which was followed by "Do or Die" and "City of Angels".

== Songs ==
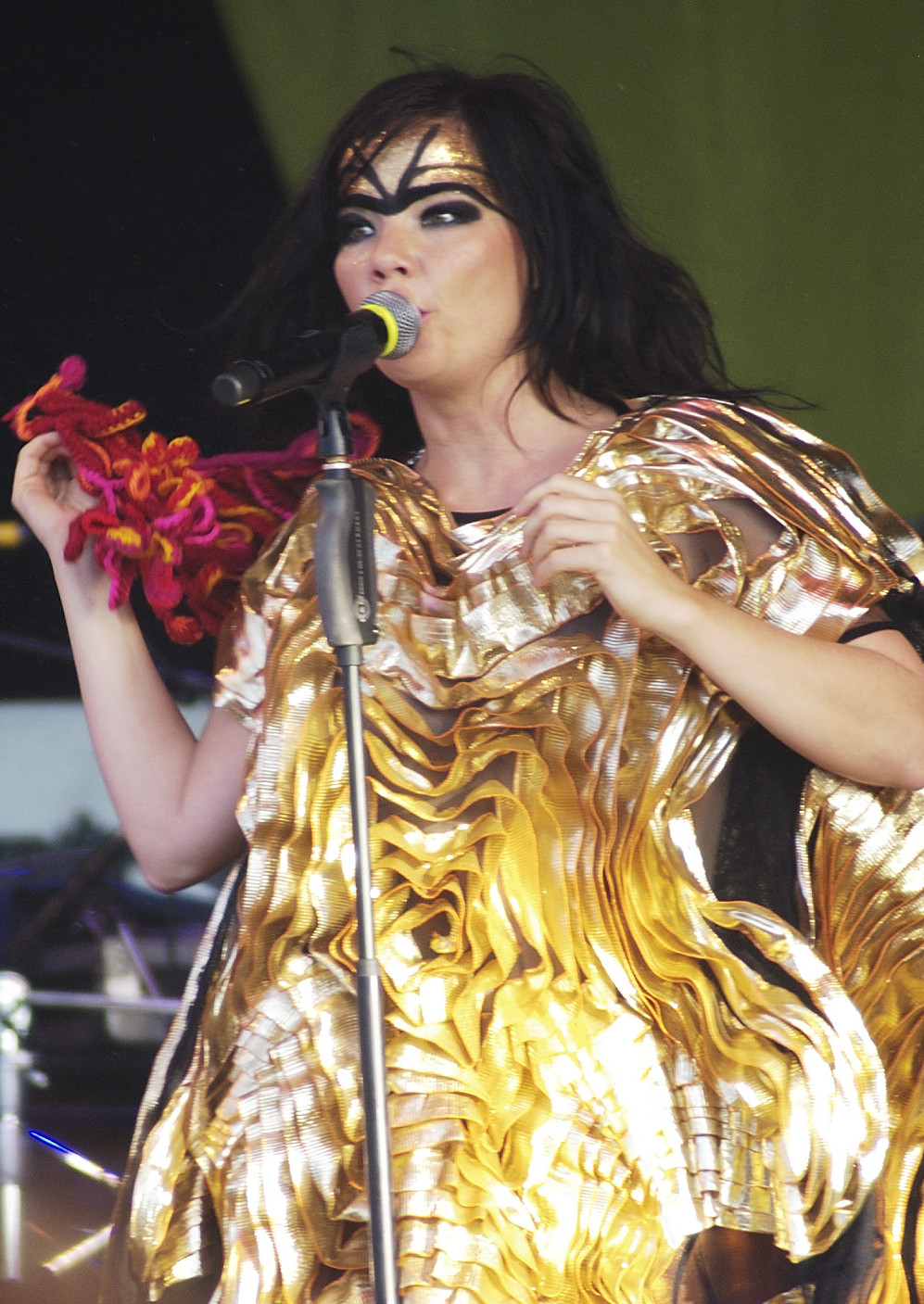
A cover of "Hunter" by Björk appears on A Beautiful Lie.

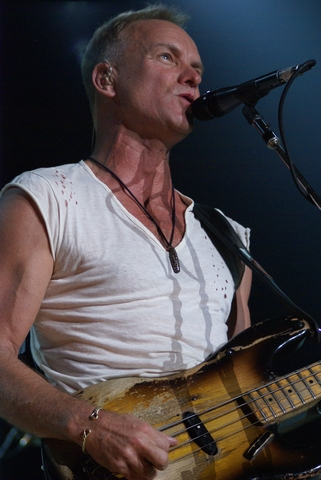
Sting wrote "Message in a Bottle", which was covered by Thirty Seconds to Mars.

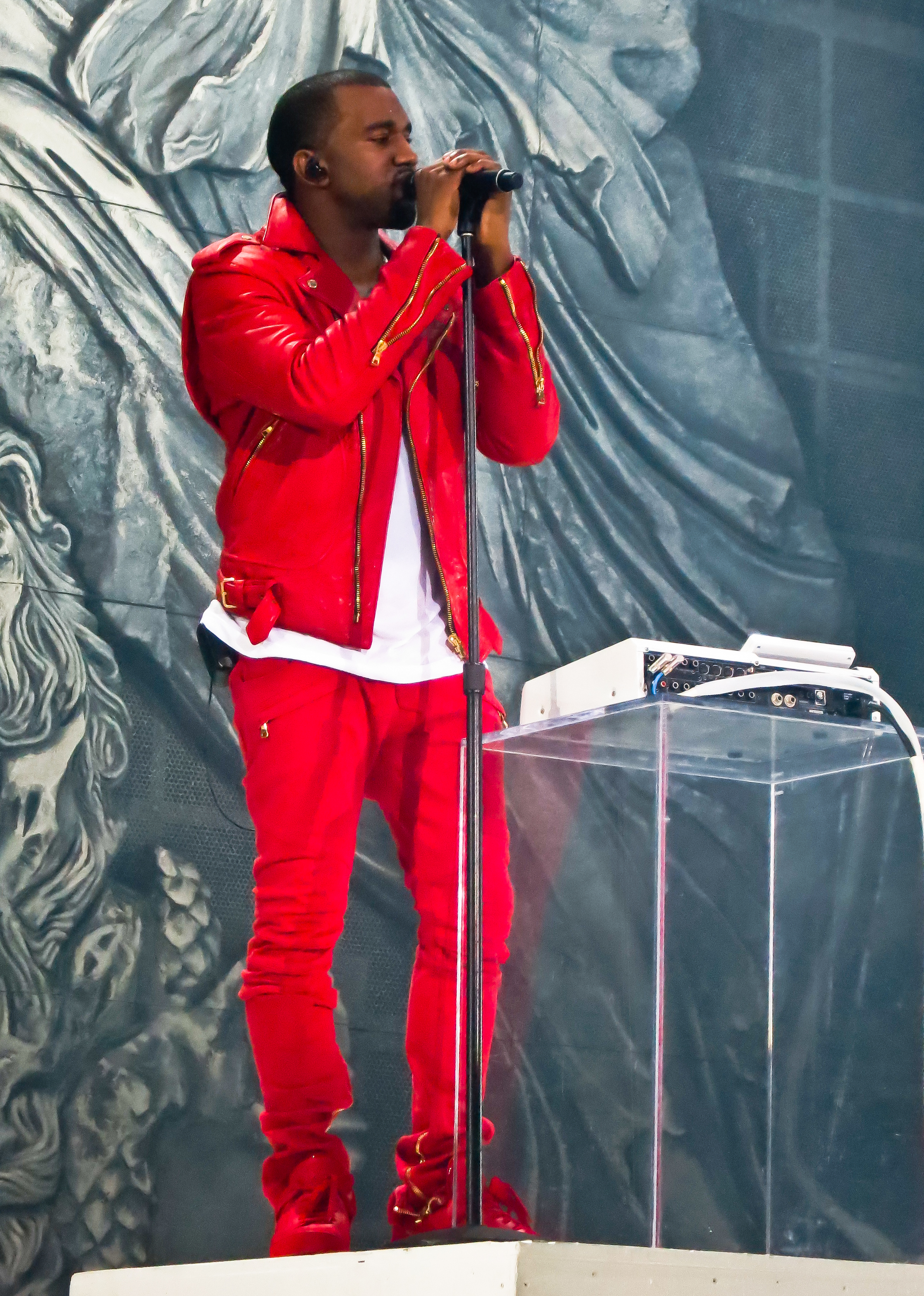
Kanye West co-wrote "Hurricane 2.0" and appears as a featured artist. Thirty Seconds to Mars also recorded a cover of "Stronger" by West.

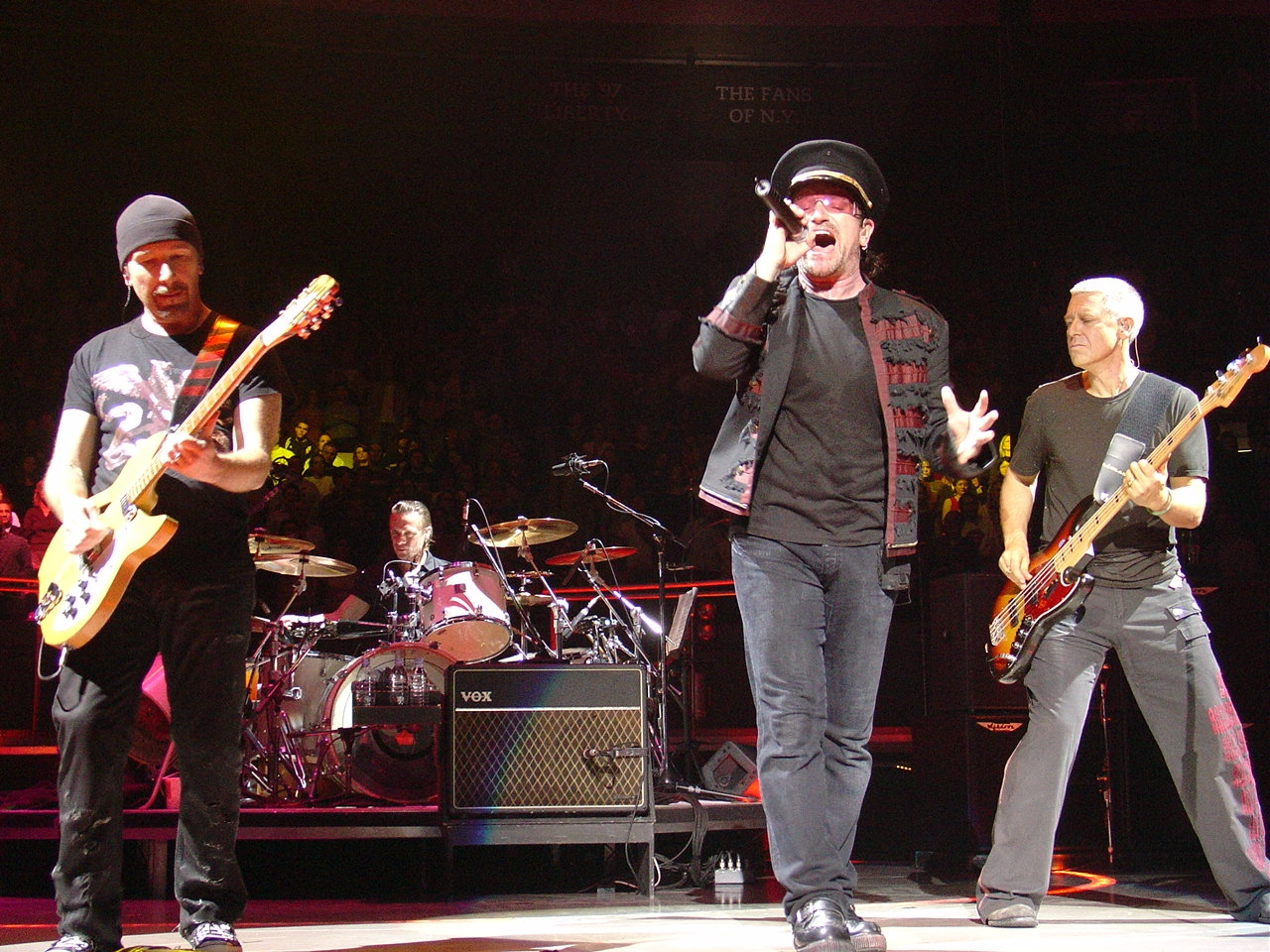
Thirty Seconds to Mars recorded a cover of "Where the Streets Have No Name" by U2.

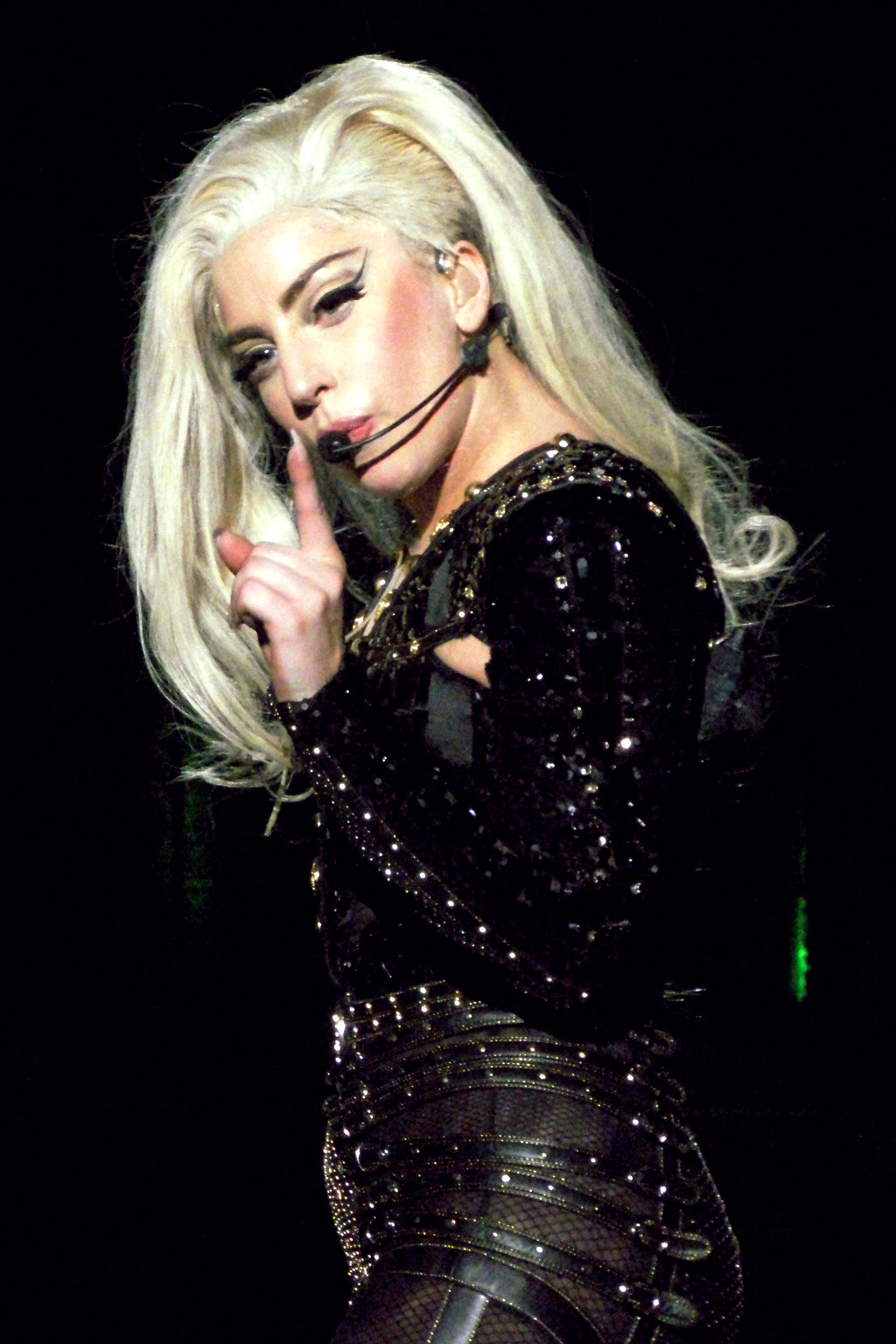
A cover of "Bad Romance" by Lady Gaga appears as on the deluxe edition of This Is War.

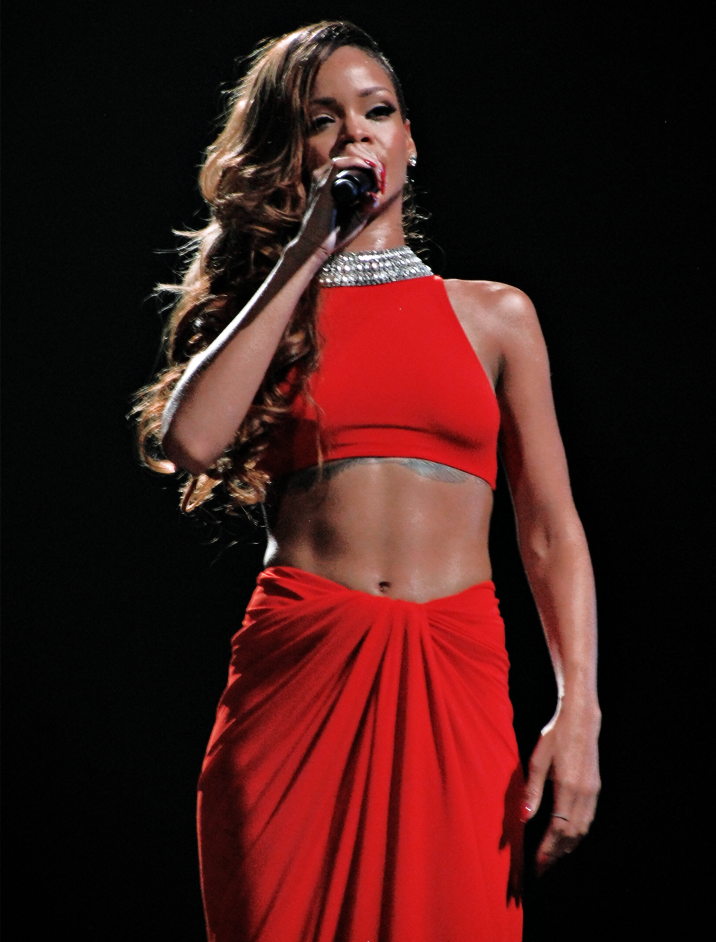
Thirty Seconds to Mars recorded a cover of "Stay" by Rihanna.

Key
†	Indicates single release
#	Indicates promotional single release

Song	Writer(s)	Album	Year	Ref.
"100 Suns"	Jared Leto	This Is War	2009	
"7:1"	Thirty Seconds to Mars	It's the End of the World but It's a Beautiful Day	2023	
"93 Million Miles"	Jared Leto	30 Seconds to Mars	2002	
"Alibi"	Jared Leto	This Is War	2009	
"Anarchy in Tokyo" (Note: "Anarchy in Tokyo" was released as a bonus track on the Japanese edition of 30 Seconds to Mars.)	Jared Leto	30 Seconds to Mars	2002	
"Attack" †	Jared Leto	A Beautiful Lie	2005	
"Avalanche"	Thirty Seconds to Mars	It's the End of the World but It's a Beautiful Day	2023	
"Bad Romance" (Note: Denotes songs which were included on the deluxe edition of This Is War)	Stefani Germanotta; Nadir Khayat	This Is War	2010	
"Battle of One"	Thirty Seconds to Mars	A Beautiful Lie	2005	
"A Beautiful Lie" †	Jared Leto	A Beautiful Lie	2005	
"Birth"	Jared Leto	Love, Lust, Faith and Dreams	2013	
"Bright Lights"	Jared Leto	Love, Lust, Faith and Dreams	2013	
"Buddha for Mary"	Jared Leto	30 Seconds to Mars	2002	
"Capricorn (A Brand New Name)" †	Jared Leto	30 Seconds to Mars	2002	
"City of Angels" †	Jared Leto	Love, Lust, Faith and Dreams	2013	
"Closer to the Edge" †	Jared Leto	This Is War	2009	
"Conquistador"	Jared Leto	Love, Lust, Faith and Dreams	2013	
"Convergence"	Shannon Leto	Love, Lust, Faith and Dreams	2013	
"Dangerous Night" †	Jared Leto; Stevie Aiello	America	2018	
"Dawn Will Rise"	Jared Leto	America	2018	
"Depuis le début"	Jared Leto	Love, Lust, Faith and Dreams	2013	
"Do or Die" †	Jared Leto	Love, Lust, Faith and Dreams	2013	
"Echelon"	Jared Leto	30 Seconds to Mars	2002	
"Edge of the Earth" †	Jared Leto	30 Seconds to Mars	2002	
"End of All Days"	Jared Leto	Love, Lust, Faith and Dreams	2013	
"End of the Beginning"	Jared Leto	30 Seconds to Mars	2002	
"Escape"	Jared Leto	This Is War	2009	
"Fallen"	Jared Leto	30 Seconds to Mars	2002	
"The Fantasy"	Jared Leto	A Beautiful Lie	2005	
"From Yesterday" †	Thirty Seconds to Mars	A Beautiful Lie	2005	
"Get Up Kid"	Thirty Seconds to Mars; Ammar Malik; Jackson Wise	It's the End of the World but It's a Beautiful Day	2023	
"The Glory - Demo 2005"	Jared Leto	A Beautiful Lie (20 Year Anniversary)	2026	
"God's Eye"	Jared Leto Stevie Aiello	A Beautiful Lie (20 Year Anniversary)	2026	
"Great Wide Open"	Jared Leto	America	2018	
"Hail to the Victor"	Jared Leto; Stevie Aiello; Jim Taihuttu; Nils Rondhuis; Thom Van Der Bruggen	America	2018	
"Hunter"	Björk Guðmundsdóttir	A Beautiful Lie	2005	
"Hurricane"	Jared Leto	This Is War	2009	
"Hurricane 2.0" † (featuring Kanye West)	Jared Leto; Kanye West	This Is War	2010	
"The Kill" †	Jared Leto	A Beautiful Lie	2005	
"The Kill" # (featuring Pitty) (Note: "The Kill" featuring Pitty was released as a promotional single in Brazil and was included as a bonus track on the Brazilian edition of A Beautiful Lie.)	Jared Leto; Priscilla Leone	A Beautiful Lie	2008	
"The Kill - Acoustic"	Jared Leto	A Beautiful Lie (20 Year Anniversary)	2026	
"Kings and Queens" †	Jared Leto	This Is War	2009	
"L490"	Shannon Leto	This Is War	2009	
"Life is Beautiful"	Thirty Seconds to Mars; Dan Reynolds; Marco Borrero; Tim Randolph	It's the End of the World but It's a Beautiful Day	2023	
"Live Like a Dream"	Jared Leto	America	2018	
"Lost These Days"	Thirty Seconds to Mars; Jon Bellion; The Monsters & Strangerz	It's the End of the World but It's a Beautiful Day	2023	
"Love Is Madness" (featuring Halsey)	Jared Leto; Ashley Nicolette Frangipaine	America	2018	
"Love These Days"	Thirty Seconds to Mars; Ori Dulitzki; Natalia Lalwani	It's the End of the World but It's a Beautiful Day	2023	
"A Modern Myth"	Jared Leto	A Beautiful Lie	2005	
"Midnight Prayer"	Thirty Seconds to Mars; J. P. Clark; Dave Gibson	It's the End of the World but It's a Beautiful Day	2023	
"Message in a Bottle"	Gordon Matthew Sumner	AOL Sessions Undercover	2007	
"The Mission"	Jared Leto	30 Seconds to Mars	2002	
"Monolith"	Jared Leto	America	2018	
"Never Not Love You"	Thirty Seconds to Mars; Jon Bellion; The Monsters & Strangerz	It's the End of the World but It's a Beautiful Day	2023	
"Night of the Hunter" #	Jared Leto	This Is War	2009	
"Northern Lights"	Jared Leto	Love, Lust, Faith and Dreams	2013	
"Oblivion"	Jared Leto	30 Seconds to Mars	2002	
"Occam's Razor" (Note: Denotes songs which were recorded for 30 Seconds to Mars but were not included on any version of the album's track listing)	—N/a	—N/a	2002	
"One Track Mind" (featuring ASAP Rocky)	Jared Leto; Rakim Mayers; Daniel Omelio	America	2018	
"Over My Head"	Jared Leto	A Beautiful Lie (20 Year Anniversary)	2026	
"Phase 1: Fortification" (Note: "Phase 1: Fortification" was a B-side to "Capricorn (A Brand New Name)" and was not included on any version of 30 Seconds to Mars.)	—N/a	—N/a	2002	
"Praying for a Riot" (Note: "Praying for a Riot" is a hidden track which appears minutes after "A Modern Myth" finishes.)	Jared Leto	A Beautiful Lie	2005	
"Pyres of Varanasi"	Jared Leto	Love, Lust, Faith and Dreams	2013	
"R-Evolve"	Jared Leto	A Beautiful Lie	2005	
"The Race"	Jared Leto	Love, Lust, Faith and Dreams	2013	
"Remedy"	Shannon Leto; Stevie Aiello	America	2018	
"Rescue Me" †	Jared Leto; Graham Muron	America	2018	
"Revolution"	—N/a	—N/a	2002	
"Rider"	Jared Leto	America	2018	
"Santa Through the Back Door"	—N/a	Kevin & Bean's Super Christmas	2006	
"Savior"	Thirty Seconds to Mars	A Beautiful Lie	2005	
"Search and Destroy" #	Jared Leto	This Is War	2009	
"Seasons"	Thirty Seconds to Mars; Connor McDonough; Riley McDonough; Johnny Goldstein	It's the End of the World but It's a Beautiful Day	2023	
"Stay"	Mikky Ekko; Justin Parker	BBC Radio 1's Live Lounge 2013	2013	
"The Story"	Jared Leto	A Beautiful Lie	2005	
"Stranger in a Strange Land"	Jared Leto	This Is War	2009	
"Stronger"	Kanye West; Thomas Bangalter; Guy-Manuel de Homem-Christo; Edwin Birdsong	Radio 1's Live Lounge – Volume 2	2007	
"The Struggle" (Note: "The Struggle" is a hidden track which appears minutes after "Year Zero" finishes.)	Jared Leto; Shannon Leto	30 Seconds to Mars	2002	
"Stuck"	Jared Leto; JKash; John Ryan; Ammar Malik	It's the End of the World but It's a Beautiful Day	2023	
"This Is War" †	Jared Leto	This Is War	2009	
"Time to Wake Up" (Note: "Time to Wake Up" was included on the instrumental version of A Beautiful Lie.)	—N/a	A Beautiful Lie	2007	
"Up in the Air" †	Jared Leto	Love, Lust, Faith and Dreams	2013	
"Valhalla"	—N/a	—N/a	2002	
"Vox Populi"	Jared Leto	This Is War	2009	
"Walk on Water" †	Jared Leto	America	2018	
"Was It a Dream?"	Jared Leto	A Beautiful Lie	2005	
"Welcome to the Universe"	Jared Leto	30 Seconds to Mars	2002	
"Where the Streets Have No Name"	Paul Hewson; David Evans; Adam Clayton; Larry Mullen, Jr.	MTV Unplugged	2011	
"World on Fire"	Thirty Seconds to Mars; Ed Sheeran; Johnny McDaid; Steve McCutcheon	It's the End of the World but It's a Beautiful Day	2023	
"Year Zero"	Jared Leto	30 Seconds to Mars	2002	
