= Conquistador (Thirty Seconds to Mars song) =

2013 song by Thirty Seconds to Mars

Song by Thirty Seconds to Mars

from the album Love, Lust, Faith and Dreams
- Recorded: 2012–13; The International Centre for the Advancement of the Arts and Sciences of Sound, Los Angeles, California
- Genre: Alternative rock
- Length: 3:12
- Label: Virgin; Universal
- Songwriter(s): Jared Leto
- Producer(s): Steve Lillywhite; Jared Leto

"Conquistador" is a song by American rock band Thirty Seconds to Mars, featured on their fourth studio album Love, Lust, Faith and Dreams (2013). Written by lead vocalist Jared Leto, who also produced the song with Steve Lillywhite, "Conquistador" features combative lyrics and call-and-response verses. Described as the "wild child" of the album, it is an alternative rock song with influences and elements from electronica. Thirty Seconds to Mars premiered the song on Vevo on May 2, 2013, two weeks before the album's release.

"Conquistador" received mostly positive reviews from music critics, who praised the composition and its raw energy. The song appeared on the UK Rock Chart upon the album's release at number 24 for a single week, being one of two songs from Love, Lust, Faith and Dreams to appear on the chart, the other being "City of Angels". Thirty Seconds to Mars included the song in the setlist of their Love, Lust, Faith and Dreams Tour and the subsequent Carnivores Tour.

== Background ==
"Conquistador" was written by lead vocalist Jared Leto, who also produced the song with Steve Lillywhite. The latter had previously worked with Thirty Seconds to Mars on the production of the band's third studio album, This Is War (2009). The song was engineered by Jamie Reed Schefman and mixed by Lillywhite. Clay Blair engineered it for mixing at Boulevard Recording in Los Angeles, California. It was recorded at The International Centre for the Advancement of the Arts and Sciences of Sound and mastered by Howie Weinberg and Dan Gerbarg at Howie Weinberg Mastering in Los Angeles. Thirty Seconds to Mars unveiled six songs from their fourth studio album Love, Lust, Faith and Dreams, including "Conquistador", during a preview held at the Electric Lady Studios in New York City on March 14, 2013.

"Conquistador" was officially revealed on March 18, 2013, at a press release for the announcement of the band's fourth album Love, Lust, Faith and Dreams. In the weeks preceding the album's release, the band promoted a Twitter hashtag, namely #MARSmay21st, to which, on May 2, 2013, it successfully reached the worldwide trending topics on the social platform. As a way of saying thanks to their fans for trending the hashtag, the band released the lyric video for "Conquistador" on Vevo the same day, two weeks before the album's release. Jared Leto explained that Thirty Seconds to Mars were "very excited" to release the song and to show the "flip side of the coin" to "Up in the Air", the album's lead single which had a more electronic-influenced sound.

== Composition ==
"Conquistador"
A 20-second sample of "Conquistador", featuring a call and response followed by heavy drumming with raw guitars and vocals.

"Conquistador" is an alternative rock song with influences and elements from electronica, utilizing programming and synthesizers. It opens with an electronic buzz followed by the sounds of guitars and drum beats, with a heavy bassline. The song features call-and-response verses leading to an anthemic chorus as Jared Leto voices the line "Say a prayer". It includes the contribution from the band's fans, credited as the Knights of the White Shadow, who provide additional vocals recorded at the band's studio. During the song's bridge, Leto proclaims "This is a fight to the death" over a "crushing" riff by guitarist Tomo Miličević and "pounding" drums by Shannon Leto. James Montgomery, writing for MTV News, felt that the sentiment "seems oddly fitting" as the song "crashes and careens" around Leto's vocals.

In an interview with Loudwire, Jared Leto named the song the "dark wild child" of Love, Lust, Faith and Dreams. He explained, "Unbridled, and full of anarchistic madness, this song is crushed full of passion and energy." He further described it as "big and bombastic and full of guitars". The track features combative lyrics and repeated chants of "We will rise again". Nadia Noir of CBS News felt that "conquistador" is an "apt title" for the "bombastic blitzkreig-rock tune, an apocalyptic summons to something greater". Michael Depland of MTV explained that the song's lyrics suggest "tumult and upheaval", while critic Emily Zemler from Billboard magazine wrote that its chanting chorus makes the song feel "almost like a war cry". In a preview of the record, Jeff Benjamin from Fuse felt that the track is "self-detonated with the band's recognizable alt-rock bombast, complete with soaring violins," and noted that it "closed with a massive, stadium-filling chorus, delivered in [Leto's] famous screamo vocal."

== Reception ==
"Conquistador" received mostly positive reviews from music critics. Emily Zemler of Billboard called it "one of the grandest numbers" on the album and an "appropriately compelling early track". Kaitlyn Hodnicki from Stature magazine described the song as a "sleazy rock stomp" that works "perfectly" with drummer Shannon Leto's "addictive beat", with lead guitarist Tomo Miličević delivering "one of his best riffs so far". She also felt that the grit in Jared Leto's voice is "surprising" and "works well" with the tone of the track. Stephen Thomas Erlewine from AllMusic praised it as one of the album's highlights. Alex Lai from Contactmusic gave the song a positive review, calling it a "thumping anthem" which is "instantly grasped" with the various chanted vocal parts. Brent Faulkner from PopMatters felt that the song "reveals" the total picture of the album, noticing the "dirty guitars that rock from the onset". He stated that "Leto never fights the production for vocal clarity, even when things grow gargantuan on the anthemic chorus."

Chris Maguire, writing for AltSounds, was impressed with the song, calling it a "solid rock track", while Ian Winwood from Kerrang! found it "rousing". Adam Silverstein of Digital Spy named it a stand-out track from the album and felt that songs like "Conquistador" "power up the vibe". James Montgomery from MTV praised its "massive guitars, stabbing strings and thundering drums". Andy Baber of musicOMH noticed the song's "big guitar riff" and the "combative lyrics". PureVolume's Tom Lanham called it a "marching" that "keeps upping the sonic ante". In a mixed review, John Watt from Drowned in Sound described the track as a "weird Brit-rock stomp" which "fails to resonate". Dan Slessor of Alternative Press felt that the song sounded "just too easy" for the typical sound of the band.

== Live performances ==
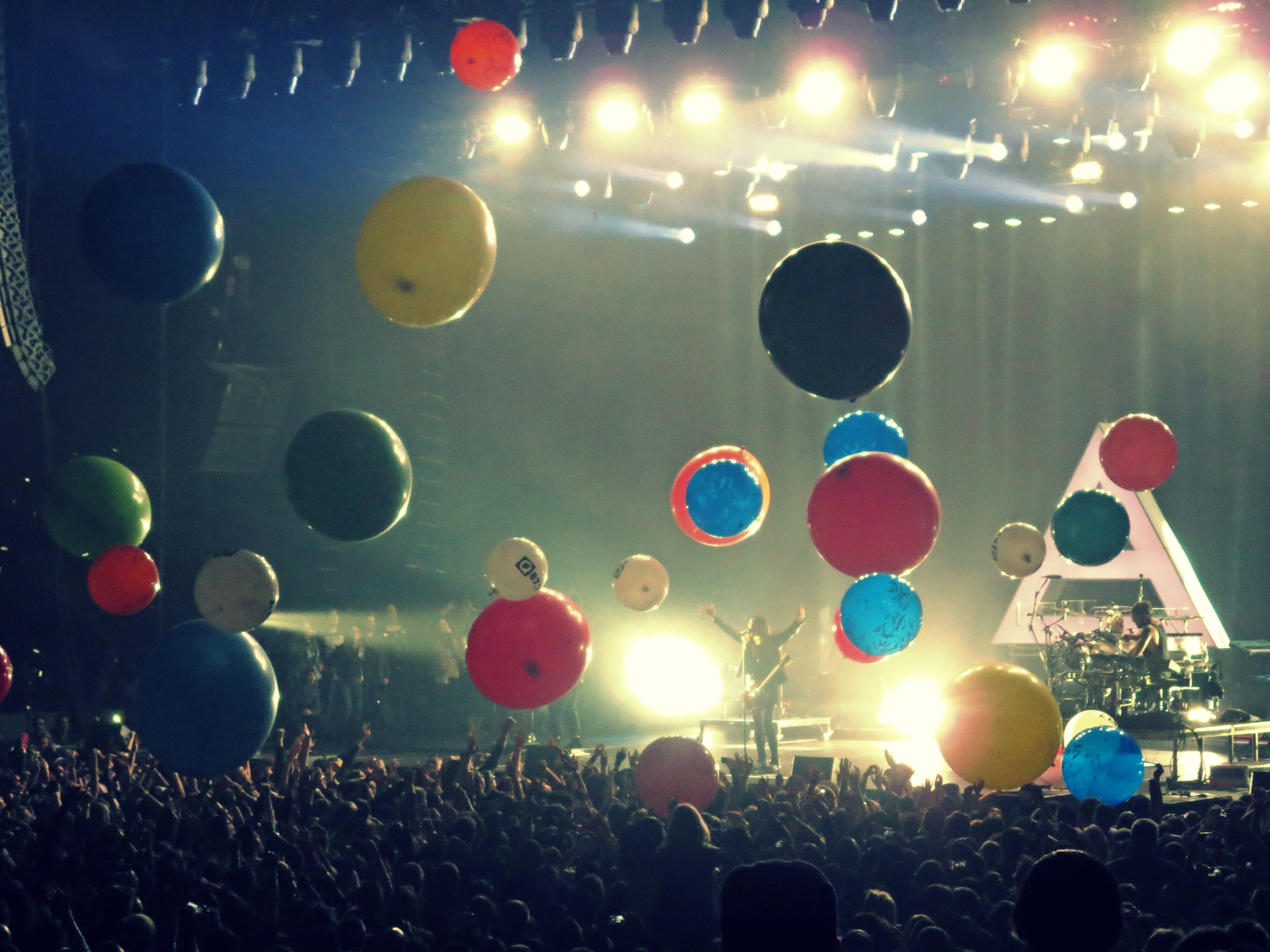
Thirty Seconds to Mars performing "Conquistador" in Rosemont, Illinois in December 2013

"Conquistador" was first performed at special concerts, dubbed as Church of Mars, in May 2013, shortly before the release of the album. It later became a signature part of the following Love, Lust, Faith and Dreams Tour. The song, along with "Birth", usually served as a set opener during the entirety of the tour, much like their appearances on Love, Lust, Faith and Dreams as opening tracks. However, it was later moved to the middle of the setlist. Fans and critics responded favorably to the song in a live setting. Ashley Zimmerman from the New Times Broward-Palm Beach felt that "everyone got even more amped" as the band performed songs like "Conquistador", while Ed Masley of The Arizona Republic deemed it a highlight of the show.

Thirty Seconds to Mars performed "Conquistador" at multiple major festivals, including Rock Werchter, Pinkpop, Download, Rock am Ring and Rock im Park, which saw the band playing as headline act. The song was also included in the Carnivores Tour, a tour on which Thirty Seconds to Mars co-headlined with Linkin Park, and usually appeared approximately halfway through the set.

== Credits and personnel ==
- Performed by Thirty Seconds to Mars
- Written by Jared Leto
- Produced by Steve Lillywhite and Jared Leto
- Recorded at The International Centre for the Advancement of the Arts and Sciences of Sound, Los Angeles, California
- Additional vocals by Knights of the White Shadow
- Audio engineering by Jamie Reed Schefman
- Mixed by Steve Lillywhite
- Engineered for Mix by Clay Blair at Boulevard Recording, Los Angeles, California
- Mastered by Howie Weinberg and Dan Gerbarg at Howie Weinberg Mastering, Los Angeles, California

Credits adapted from Love, Lust, Faith and Dreams album liner notes.

== Charts ==
Chart (2013)	Peak position
UK Rock (Official Charts Company)	24
