= Do or Die (Thirty Seconds to Mars song) =

Single by Thirty Seconds to Mars

from the album Love, Lust, Faith and Dreams
- Released: July 1, 2013
- Recorded: The International Centre for the Advancement of the Arts and Sciences of Sound, Los Angeles, California
- Genre: Electronic rock
- Length: 4:07
- Label: Virgin; Universal
- Songwriter: Jared Leto
- Producer: Jared Leto

Thirty Seconds to Mars singles chronology
"Up in the Air" (2013)	"Do or Die" (2013)	"City of Angels" (2013)

Music video
- "Do or Die" on YouTube

"Do or Die" is a song by American rock band Thirty Seconds to Mars, featured on their fourth studio album Love, Lust, Faith and Dreams (2013). Written and produced by lead vocalist Jared Leto, "Do or Die" explores the feeling of standing up and living one's dreams using ironic undertones. The song is styled in electronic rock and imbued with elements of arena rock. It was serviced to mainstream radio in July 2013 in Europe, and was released as a promotional single in the United States in March 2014. A version of the song remixed by Dutch music producer Afrojack was digitally released in March 2014 and later included on the deluxe edition of Afrojack's debut studio album Forget the World (2014).

"Do or Die" received positive reviews from music critics, who hailed its musical diversity and its euphoric but minimalistic nature. It charted in some nations due to digital sales from the parent album. The accompanying music video, directed by Leto, features live footage of Thirty Seconds to Mars onstage as well as stories from their fans, personally interviewed by Leto. The video garnered general acclaim from critics, who lauded its atmosphere and simplicity. The song was included in the setlist of the band's Love, Lust, Faith and Dreams Tour and the subsequent Carnivores Tour.

== Recording and composition ==
"Do or Die" was written and produced by Jared Leto. It was engineered by Jamie Reed Schefman and mixed by Serban Ghenea. John Hanes engineered it for mixing at Mixstar Studios in Virginia Beach, Virginia. The song was recorded at The International Centre for the Advancement of the Arts and Sciences of Sound in Los Angeles, California and mastered by Howie Weinberg and Dan Gerbarg at Howie Weinberg Mastering. Thirty Seconds to Mars unveiled six songs from their fourth studio album Love, Lust, Faith and Dreams, including "Do or Die", during a preview event held at the Electric Lady Studios in New York City on March 14, 2013.

"Do or Die"
A portion of "Do or Die"'s bridge, featuring heavy use of synthesizers and drum beats influenced by arena rock.

"Do or Die" is an electronic rock song with influences and elements from arena rock. It opens with a female voiceover introducing the song's title in the Chinese language, after which there is an electronic introduction. This is followed by the sound of guitars, drum beats and synthesizers. After the first verse, the pre-chorus follows, with Leto voicing the line, "I will never forget the moment". The full-throated chorus then follows, which features heavy use of synthesizers and drums. The song includes a contribution from the band's fans, credited as the Knights of the White Shadow, who provide additional vocals recorded at the band's studio.

In an interview with PureVolume, Leto explained that the song is "about standing up and living out your dreams", but also features an ironic connotation. Markos Papadatos, in his review for Digital Journal, called it an "upbeat" song which "deals with one taking their own stance on their beliefs, and living life to the fullest". In a preview of the record, Jeff Benjamin from Fuse described the song by saying that the band goes "the synthy dance route on the track's intro before fire-alarm guitars and pummeling drums roar in and smash the Korg keyboards to bits".

== Release ==
"Do or Die" was released as a promotional single in Europe in July 2013 through Virgin Records. The song debuted at number 98 on the Ultratip chart of Belgium's Flemish region on August 24. The following week, it jumped to number 73 and peaked at number 40 on September 21. On August 30, 2013, it debuted at number 75 on the Ö3 Austria Top 40. In the Czech Republic, the song entered the national airplay chart at number 91 on the week ending October 20, 2013. In Slovakia, it debuted at number 67 on September 22, 2013 and eventually peaked at number 29 on January 26, 2014. Polydor Records released "Do or Die" in the United Kingdom on September 9, 2013. It entered the UK Rock Chart at number 38. After four weeks, the song peaked at number seven on the issue dated September 28, 2013. "Do or Die" was used by Major League Baseball as the theme song for the 2013 Major League Baseball Postseason.

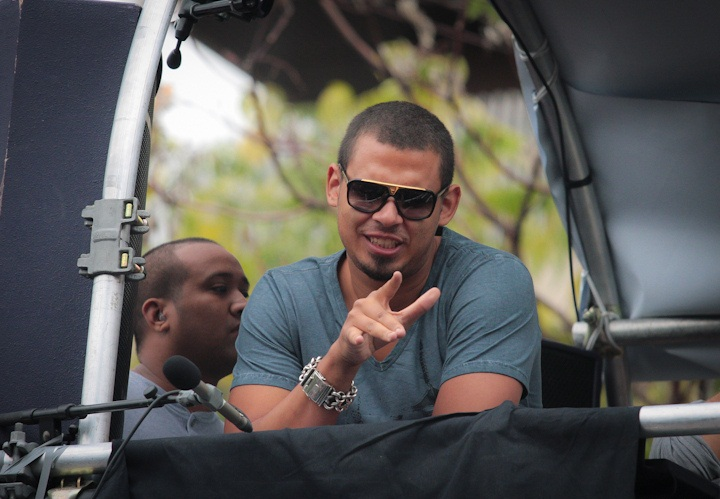
Dutch music producer Afrojack remixed "Do or Die" for the song's digital release.

In March 2014, it was announced that Dutch music producer Afrojack and Thirty Seconds to Mars had collaborated on a remixed version of the song. It became commercially available for download in March 2014 and was later included on the deluxe edition of Afrojack's debut studio album Forget the World. Leto described the collaboration by saying, "It was a lot of fun, and it's kind of our little summer song. I think it's good to do things that are unexpected. It keeps it exciting and collaboration is always an interesting thing." The remixed version of "Do or Die" entered the Dutch Top 40 at number 53 on April 19, 2014. After five weeks, it peaked at number 42. The song debuted at number 46 on US Dance/Electronic Songs and reached a peak of number 33 on June 7, 2014.

In the United States, "Do or Die" was sent to modern rock radio on March 17, 2014, after the release of "City of Angels". It debuted on the Billboard Hot Rock & Alternative Songs chart at number 40 on August 9.

== Critical reception ==
"Do or Die" received generally positive reviews from music critics. Emily Zemler, of Billboard, wrote that between the album's "eclectic experimentation" and "voiceless soundscapes", the band "slotted in this propulsive rocker, an arena-ready anthem". She considered "Do or Die" to be one of the album's "most straightforward tracks". Dan Slessor of Alternative Press praised it as one of the album's highlights, in which Thirty Seconds to Mars exercises their capacity for writing "titanic choruses full of sweeping drama in a manner that is almost untouchable". Brent Faulkner from PopMatters gave a mixed response, writing that the song "relies on a familiar beat as well as liberal layering". Writers for Contactmusic commended "Do or Die" as one of the standout songs on Love, Lust, Faith and Dreams and a "slow-burning hit of epic, synth-heavy electronica".

Kaitlyn Hodnicki from Stature magazine was impressed with the song, calling it one of the album's more upbeat tracks, which "blooms into another epic soundscape led by [Leto's] vocals and some brilliantly used electronic elements". She felt that the fans' vocal contribution to the song harks back to previous album This Is War without sounding "cliché or overdone". Sarah O' Hara from Lowdown also responded positively to the track, writing that "glorious chants fuel the uplifting 'Do or Die'". In a mixed review, John Watt from Drowned in Sound called the song "half-baked synth-rock." Markos Papadatos from Digital Journal rated it an A and wrote that "the band soars as whole on this tune", calling Leto's vocals "raw, powerful and captivating."

== Music video ==
=== Background ===
"This is a story about an incredible adventure that we all shared together this summer. A summer that we will never forget. It's also a reminder (for myself as well) to live life no matter what. But ultimately it's a love letter to you all. The believers. ... Sharing this journey with you all has been the gift of a lifetime and I hope you can see and feel that in this piece, our gratitude. ... I hope it speaks to all of you and lets you know how much you mean to us."

— Jared Leto, in a note accompanying the music video

The music video for "Do or Die" was directed by Leto, who was credited as pseudonym Bartholomew Cubbins. Leto developed its concept as a companion piece to the music video of "Closer to the Edge" (2010), shot during the Into the Wild Tour. "Do or Die" was filmed in the summer of 2013, during a European leg of the Love, Lust, Faith and Dreams Tour and features live footage of Thirty Seconds to Mars onstage as well as fan commentary. It premiered on August 5, 2013.

Leto personally interviewed the band's fans, termed as the Echelon, who shared stories about the importance of music in their lives, some personal struggles and their own dreams. In an interview with MTV News, the frontman explained that he was inspired by the will to document the personal changes experienced by the band and its audience. "Most of the interviews", Leto explained, "I did myself, so they're really intimate. It's me, it's them, and it's the camera. What I've found is, that if you talk to everybody long enough, you find an incredible story. Every single person has a moment in their life, something that they've found a solution for, a story to tell. Some are funny, some are really intriguing, and if you ask the right questions, you get interesting answers."

The music video begins with a German boy who Leto had previously met in Berlin. He spoke about the loss of his father and how he had played a Thirty Seconds to Mars song at the funeral. After Leto again met the German fan again at a concert in Austria, he asked him to share his story on camera. Leto explained, "At the show in Austria, where there were tens of thousands of people, and I ran into him and interviewed him; he was the first interview of the summer, and he shared this story about losing his father, and what it taught him, it was really an organic and serendipitous and beautiful way to begin. He shared a really personal part of himself and we're really grateful to him, and that continued throughout all the interviews."

=== Reception ===
Upon its release, the video received general acclaim from critics and fans. James Montgomery from MTV described it as a love-letter to the band's fans and a document of life on the road. He also considered it the "spiritual sequel to their stirring 2010 live clip" for "Closer to the Edge". Karen Bliss of Noisecreep was impressed with the video and opened her review by writing, "Thirty Seconds to Mars never fails to impress with what they can do within the confines of a music video." She believed that its simplicity turned out to be "impactful, touching and uniting". Garon Cockrell from The Pratt Tribune gave the video a positive review, calling it "excellent". John Walker from MTV felt that throughout the fans' personal struggles "music has helped these individuals persevere and continue to enjoy life. Likewise, Thirty Seconds to Mars seem so moved by the audience's emotions every time they perform live, 'Do or Die's concept seems to be that they want to return the favor."

Writers for MuchMusic noticed the band's tradition for producing unconventional music videos and praised "Do or Die" calling it "another epic" short film. Markos Papadatos of Digital Journal found it "compelling and visually striking", noticing real-life people from all over the world telling their "moving stories" about their aspirations and dreams. Sean Fitz-Gerald, writing for Mashable, called the video "an inspiring anthem featuring heartfelt, fan-filmed messages".

== Live performances ==
"Do or Die" was first performed at special concerts, dubbed as Church of Mars, in May 2013, shortly before the release of the album. The song later became a set-fixture of the Love, Lust, Faith and Dreams Tour, usually appearing as the penultimate song before "Up in the Air". However, after the festival tour in June 2013, which saw the band travel to Rock am Ring and Rock im Park as headline act, the song was moved to the middle of the setlist, usually played before Leto's acoustic B-stage set. "Do or Die" was also included in the Carnivores Tour, which Thirty Seconds to Mars co-headlined with Linkin Park, and usually appeared approximately halfway through the set. Reviewing a concert, Payal Patel from AXS called "Do or Die" a "sweeping rock anthem", while Ben Jolley of the Nottingham Post described a performance of the song as energetic and inspirational.

On September 23, 2014, Thirty Seconds to Mars performed the song on The Ellen DeGeneres Show, featuring a ten-person choir. During the performance, Leto swung a flag bearing messages in support of certain social goals, and invited the audience to join the band on stage towards the finale, as confetti fell from the ceiling. Markos Papadatos, writing for Digital Journal, commented that the performance was another indication that Jared Leto is one of the "most charismatic live performers" in contemporary rock and that Thirty Seconds to Mars "is always able to put on a high-energy show".

== Track listing ==
EU promo CD single

1. "Do or Die" – 4:09

UK promo CD single

1. "Do or Die" (Radio Edit) – 3:41
2. "Do or Die" (Album Version) – 4:11
3. "Do or Die" (Instrumental) – 4:06

Digital download

1. "Do or Die" – 4:07

Digital download Remix

1. "Do or Die" (Afrojack vs. Thirty Seconds to Mars Remix) (Club Version) – 6:18

Netherlands digital download Remix

1. "Do or Die" (Afrojack vs. Thirty Seconds to Mars Remix) – 4:38

== Credits and personnel ==
- Performed by Thirty Seconds to Mars
- Written and produced by Jared Leto
- Recorded at The International Centre for the Advancement of the Arts and Sciences of Sound, Los Angeles, California
- Additional vocals by Knights of the White Shadow
- Audio engineering by Jamie Reed Schefman
- Mixed by Serban Ghenea
- Engineered for Mix by John Hanes at Mixstar Studios, Virginia Beach, Virginia
- Mastered by Howie Weinberg and Dan Gerbarg at Howie Weinberg Mastering, Los Angeles, California

Credits adapted from Love, Lust, Faith and Dreams album liner notes.

== Charts ==
Chart performance for "Do or Die"
Chart (2013–14)	Peak position
Austria (Ö3 Austria Top 40)	75
Belgium (Ultratip Bubbling Under Flanders)	40
Czech Republic (Rádio Top 100)	91
Netherlands (Dutch Top 40)	42
Slovakia (Rádio Top 100)	29
UK Airplay (Music Week)	49
UK Rock & Metal (OCC)	7
US Hot Dance/Electronic Songs (Billboard)	33
US Hot Rock & Alternative Songs (Billboard)	38
US Rock Airplay (Billboard)	27

== Release history ==
Region	Date	Format	Label
Europe	July 1, 2013	Contemporary hit radio	Virgin; Universal
Italy	July 5, 2013	Contemporary hit radio	Universal
United Kingdom	September 9, 2013	Contemporary hit radio	Polydor
United States	March 11, 2014	Digital download – Remix	Island; Universal
Europe	March 16, 2014	Digital download – Remix	Island; Universal
United States	March 17, 2014	Modern rock	Virgin
Netherlands	March 18, 2014	Digital download – Remix	Island; Universal
United States	August 26, 2014	Contemporary hit radio – Remix	Def Jam
