= City of Angels (Thirty Seconds to Mars song) =

2013 song by Thirty Seconds to Mars

Single by Thirty Seconds to Mars

from the album Love, Lust, Faith and Dreams
- Released: October 25, 2013
- Recorded: The International Centre for the Advancement of the Arts and Sciences of Sound, Los Angeles, California
- Genre: Synthrock
- Length: 5:02
- Label: Virgin; Universal
- Songwriter: Jared Leto
- Producers: Steve Lillywhite; Jared Leto

Thirty Seconds to Mars singles chronology
"Do or Die" (2013)	"City of Angels" (2013)	"Walk on Water" (2017)

Music video
- "City of Angels" on YouTube

"City of Angels" is a song by American rock band Thirty Seconds to Mars, featured on their fourth studio album Love, Lust, Faith and Dreams (2013). Written by lead vocalist Jared Leto, who co-produced the song with Steve Lillywhite, "City of Angels" was inspired by Leto's experience of living in Los Angeles with his family and was influenced by the city's culture. Imbued with elements of synthrock as well as music from the 1980s, the track was cited as an example of the album's variety and experimentation. It was one of the first songs to be written for Love, Lust, Faith and Dreams, but required a long period of time to record.

"City of Angels" was released as a promotional single in July 2013 in the United States, and was serviced to mainstream radio in Europe in October 2013. It received general acclaim from music critics, who commended the song's composition and production. Following the release of Love, Lust, Faith and Dreams, the track appeared in the lower regions of the UK Rock Chart. When released as a single, it re-entered the chart reaching number 21, peaked at number eight on the Alternative Songs in the US, and experienced moderate success in some international markets due to digital sales from the album. A piano version of the song was digitally released in July 2014.

Jared Leto directed the music video for the song, which features several personalities joining the three members of Thirty Seconds to Mars in sharing their visions about Los Angeles. The video was favorably reviewed by critics, who complimented the simplicity and cohesion with the song's message. It received the Loudwire Music Award for Best Rock Video and was nominated for Best Cinematography at the 2014 MTV Video Music Awards. Thirty Seconds to Mars performed a piano rendition of the song at the 2014 iHeartRadio Music Awards. "City of Angels" was included in the setlist of the band's Love, Lust, Faith and Dreams Tour and subsequent Carnivores Tour.

== Recording and inspiration ==
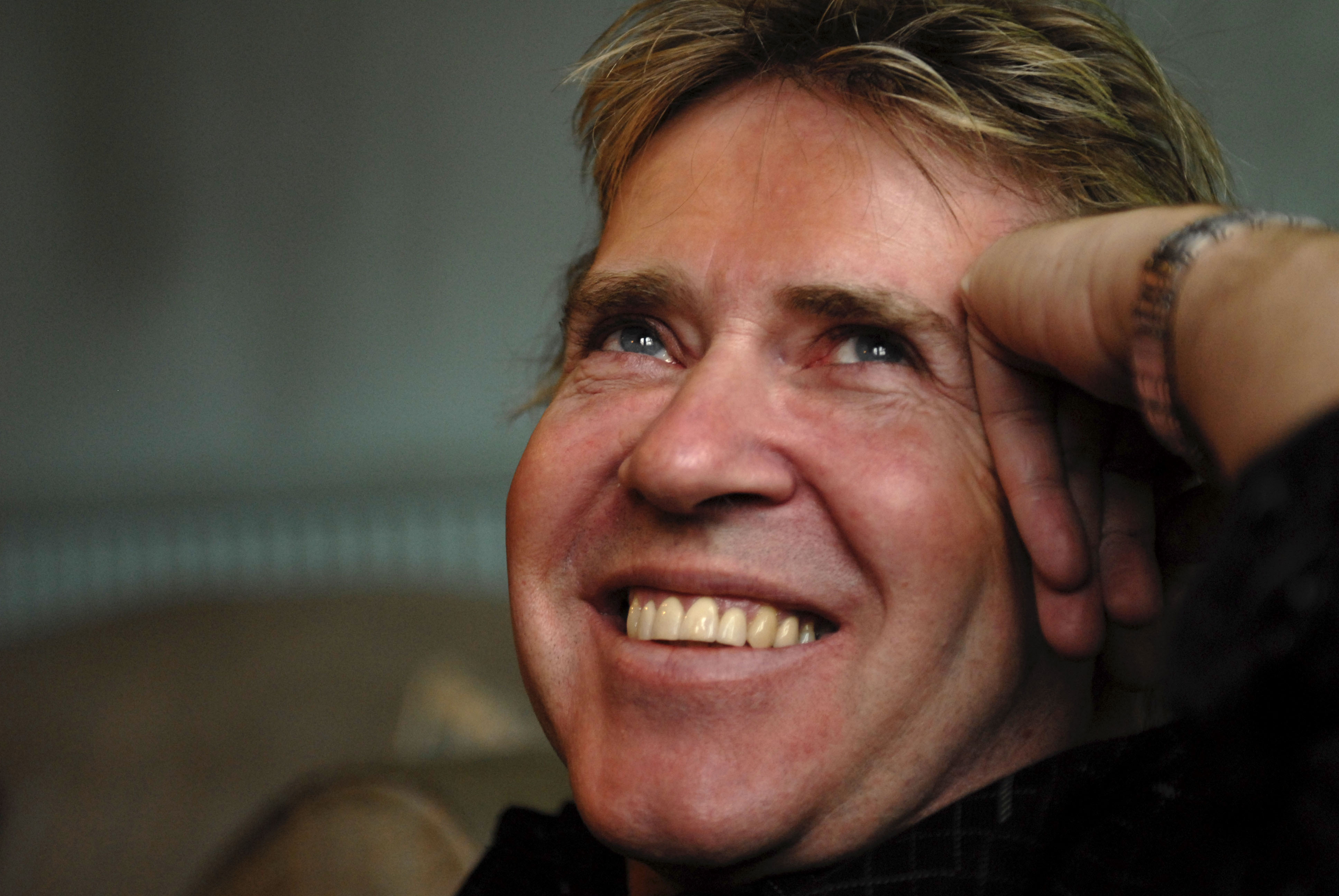
Previous collaborator Steve Lillywhite produced the song.

"City of Angels" was written by lead vocalist Jared Leto, who also produced the song with Steve Lillywhite. The latter had previously worked with Thirty Seconds to Mars on the production of the band's third studio album, This Is War (2009). The song was engineered by Jamie Reed Schefman and mixed by Serban Ghenea. John Hanes engineered it for mixing at Mixstar Studios in Virginia Beach, Virginia. It was recorded at The International Centre for the Advancement of the Arts and Sciences of Sound in Los Angeles, California and mastered by Howie Weinberg and Dan Gerbarg at Howie Weinberg Mastering. Thirty Seconds to Mars unveiled six songs from their fourth studio album Love, Lust, Faith and Dreams, including "City of Angels", during a preview held at the Electric Lady Studios in New York City on March 14, 2013. Shannon Leto revealed that it was the oldest song written for the album and took a long time to make.

While writing the song, Leto was influenced by the culture of Los Angeles and inspired by his relationship with it. He explained that pursuing his creative ambitions in Los Angeles had led to a "love/hate relationship" with the city. Leto told Interview magazine, "the song is about people coming to the City of Angels to live their dreams and to make their dreams their reality. It's about how the other people they've met in the city have helped them—you know, a group of people all kind of joining together into a community of outsiders, of mavericks, of freaks, of artists. It's about coming to a place to do something different and something special."

== Composition and theme ==
"City of Angels"
A 30-second sample of "City of Angels", which uses the background strings and synthesizers to set the tone of the song

"City of Angels" is a synthrock song with influences and elements from experimental music. It opens with an instrumental section and "gently burbling" synthesizers. It follows with the sounds of drum beats, including taiko drums, then transitions into a piano melody. After the first verse, the chorus follows, with Leto singing, "Lost in the City of Angels / Down in the comfort of strangers / I found myself in the fire burned hills / In the land of a billion lights". During the bridge, he ornaments his vocal lines with melodic crescendos, affirming "I am home". After the final chorus, the song reaches a drum-heavy climax. Emily Zemler from Billboard cited "City of Angels" as an example of variety and experimentation in Love, Lust, Faith and Dreams. She described the song as a "pulsating, subtler track that employs a blipping electronic beat rather than the band's usual rock backdrop".

In a preview of the record, Jeff Benjamin from Fuse acknowledged the 1980s influences that resonated throughout the track and noted that "hard rock guitars and percussion come crashing in on the chorus." Sarah O' Hara, while reviewing Love, Lust, Faith and Dreams for Lowdown, compared the song to "Kings and Queens", a track with a similar structure included on This Is War featuring sparse verses and slow atmospheric builds to the chorus. In an interview with Loudwire, Leto described "City of Angels" as a very personal song about a specific place. He said, "It's the story of my brother and I going to Los Angeles to make our dreams come true. It's a love letter to that beautiful and bizarre land." Leto later explained that the song could refer to any place a person goes to fulfill his or her own dreams. Mary Ouellette, writing for Loudwire, felt that the song "tells a passionate tale of finding comfort in calling the city of Los Angeles home."

== Release ==
In the United States, "City of Angels" was sent to rock music radio as a promotional single from Love, Lust, Faith and Dreams on July 30, 2013. Following its release, the song debuted at number 47 on the Rock Airplay chart and reached a peak of number 18 on the issue dated November 23. It entered the Alternative Songs chart at number 40, becoming a "Hot Shot Debut". Over the following weeks, it gradually ascended the chart to a peak of number eight on the issue dated November 9. It also debuted on the Hot Rock Songs chart at number 39 and peaked at number 31 the following week. In March 2014, the iTunes Store offered a free download of "City of Angels" for a limited time in North America. An acoustic version of the song was released on the soundtrack of Dallas Buyers Club (2013), a film in which Jared Leto starred. A percentage of the proceeds from the sales was donated to the AIDS relief charity Project Red's Global Fund.

"City of Angels" impacted mainstream radio in Europe in November 2013, after the release of "Do or Die". In Finland, the song entered the national airplay chart at number 83. It jumped to number 69 the following week and peaked at number 32 on December 22. In Portugal, it reached a peak of number 17 and was later certified gold by the Associação Fonográfica Portuguesa (AFP), denoting sales of over 10,000 units throughout the country. A remixed version of the song by German music producer Markus Schulz became commercially available for downloading in June 2014.

Polydor Records released "City of Angels" in the United Kingdom on December 2, 2013. The song had initially entered the UK Rock Chart during the release of Love, Lust, Faith and Dreams for one week, but later re-entered after its single release, peaking at number 21. It also peaked in the top 100 on several national record charts, including Australia, Germany, Czech Republic, and Italy. A piano version of "City of Angels" was released in digital format in July 2014.

== Critical reception ==
"City of Angels" was met with general acclaim from music critics. Dan Slessor of Alternative Press named it a stand-out track from the album and found it "compelling from start to finish, building from ethereal beginnings to an enormous, drum-heavy climax". Stephen Thomas Erlewine from AllMusic praised it as one of the album's highlights. Rick Pearson from the Evening Standard acknowledged the influences of U2 and complimented Leto's vocals. Markos Papadatos, writing for Digital Journal, stated that the song proves that Jared Leto is one of the finest vocalists and songwriters in the modern rock genre of music. Johan Wippsson from Melodic chose the song as a highlight on Love, Lust, Faith and Dreams, and commended its "bombastic and huge choruses".

John Gentile from Rolling Stone was impressed with the song, noticing that it is built in volume and complexity until Leto "was yelling at the top of his lungs." Reviewing the piano version of the song, Gentile commented that "it focuses on delicate piano until a breathy Leto gently enters and spins the tale of his decision to move to Los Angeles and his earliest days there." He wrote that "the song rises and falls until finally, it locks into a snapping beat and Leto exclaims, 'I am home!'" Alex Lai from Contactmusic gave the song a positive review, finding the band in a "less aggressive mood" as they move toward "U2-style stadium rock" and Leto tones down his vocal delivery. Lai described it as "essentially a love song for the city of Los Angeles on which the sentiment seems genuine". Alternative Addiction ranked "City of Angels" at number 11 on its list of the 100 Best Songs of 2014.

Kaitlyn Hodnicki from Stature magazine noted the intimacy featured in the track despite its anthemic quality. She considered it "a major leap forward in terms of Jared Leto's song writing", saying that the lyrics "lay the often enigmatic frontman bare" as he pays homage to Los Angeles. She also felt that "Leto's love of U2 is no secret and displayed to full effect in this uplifting song with the piano, electronics, vocals and drums all weaving together effortlessly." In a mixed review, John Watt from Drowned in Sound called it a "soulless slab of soft-rock". Brent Faulkner from PopMatters wrote that the song "isn't too shabby, filled with minimalistic ideas and pummeling drums." Chris Maguire of AltSounds criticized the influences of U2 featured in the track, while Andy Baber from musicOMH called it a "corny ballad" which makes Thirty Seconds to Mars a "love-them-or-hate-them band". Writers of 91X named "City of Angels" the 33rd best song of 2013.

== Music video ==
=== Development ===
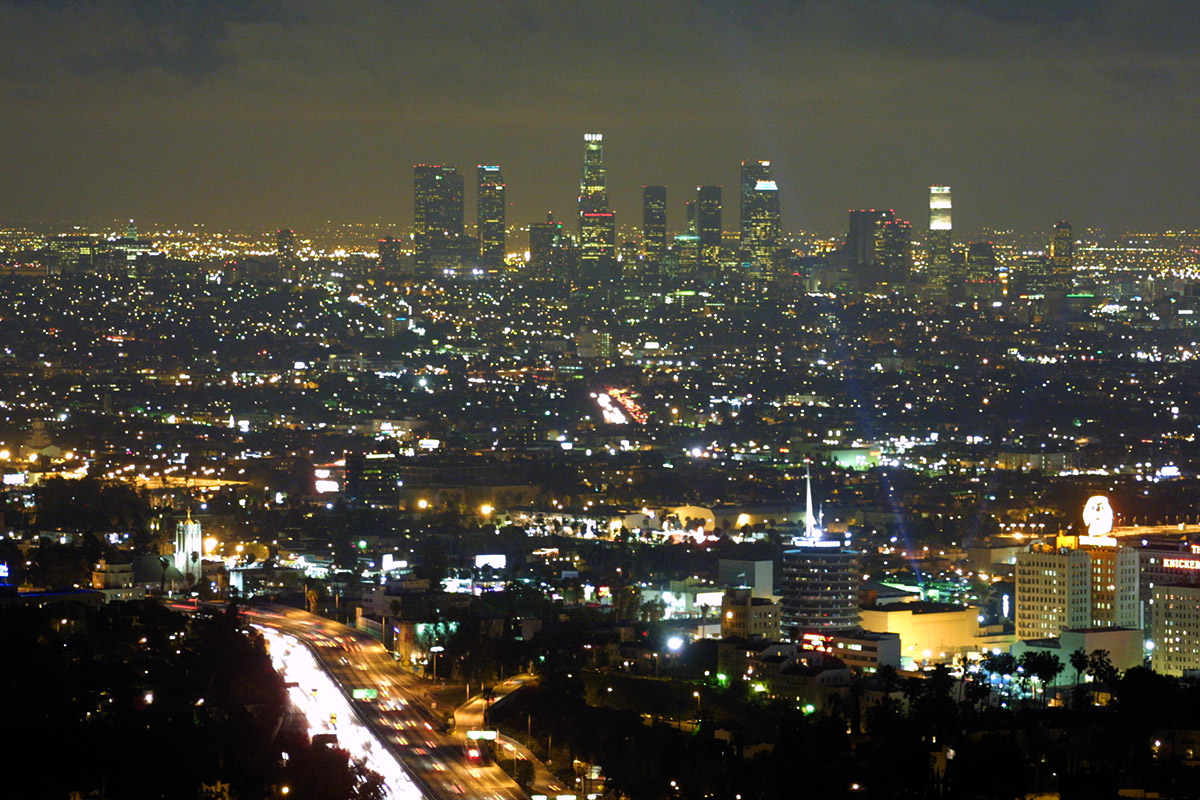
A portion of the video was shot in Los Angeles over the course of several nights.

In August 2013, Jared Leto told MTV News that he was preparing to shoot a short film for "City of Angels". While he did not reveal much about the music video concept, he added: "It's going to be powerful and emotional and definitely something special." The shooting took place from August 16–17 in Los Angeles, filming multiple monoliths and murals. Leto interviewed celebrities who joined the three members of Thirty Seconds to Mars in sharing their visions about Los Angeles. He also recruited Michael Jackson and Marilyn Monroe impersonators as well as homeless people in the production of the video. After filming, Leto talked about the inspiration behind the video, stating, "Telling stories is a big part of what I do, so it was a really natural and comfortable thing. I think because I did all the interviews myself—I talked to fellow artists and they felt really comfortable. They shared a side of themselves that we don't share very often." Footage from the song's lyric video, which was shot atop the Hollywood Hills, was used for a part of the short film that featured Leto singing the song against the backdrop of a Los Angeles sunset.

The short film was produced by Emma Ludbrook, Allan Wachs and Jared Leto, who also directed. Although it is billed as a "Bartholomew Cubbins Film" (Leto's longtime pseudonym), "City of Angels" is the first directorial project directly credited to Jared Leto. He explained, "It was the first time I'd ever done that. I'd used several different names, but it was just such a personal thing. I thought it was appropriate to put my name on that piece." Previous collaborator Devid Levlin served as director of photography. It was edited by Leto, Benjamin Entrup and Mischa Meyer. The short film included commentary from Kanye West, Christopher Lloyd Dennis, Juliette Lewis, Heather Levinger, Haywood, Lindsay Lohan, Olivia Wilde, Steve Nash, Ashley Olsen, Lily Collins, James Franco, Selena Gomez, Alan Cumming, Anthony Warfield, Jovan Rameau, Holly Beavon, Shaun White, Corey Feldman, and Yosh. "City of Angels" marked the second collaboration of Thirty Seconds to Mars with Kanye West, as they first worked together on the track "Hurricane" (2010).

=== Release ===
The short film for "City of Angels" premiered on October 12, 2013 during the Thirty Seconds to Mars concert at the Hollywood Bowl. The show was broadcast worldwide on the internet through the online platform VyRT. Upon the video's premiere, Mary Bonney from LA Music Blog predicted that the short film "will surely be praised by every city-dwelling dreamer." Thirty Seconds to Mars teased a preview of the music video on October 28. The following day, the short film debuted on Vevo. It was preceded by a lyric video which premiered on August 23, 2013. Individual clips featuring previously unseen interview footage of Kanye West, James Franco and Selena Gomez debuted in the following months.

In a press release, Jared Leto explained the meaning behind the music video: "'City of Angels' is a short film about this wild, weird, and wonderful land, Los Angeles, California. A place that has left its mark on the world's imagination and a place where dreams can actually come true. I made this short film so I could share my thoughts on this incredibly special place and talk to others about theirs. It's not so much about this particular city but more about the people who inhabit it." He further said, "It's a story about hope and dreams. It's a story about people making the impossible possible—whether it's Kanye West, James Franco, or a kid who's living on the streets on Hollywood Boulevard. It's a story about survival and about what it takes to become who you really want to be."

=== Synopsis ===
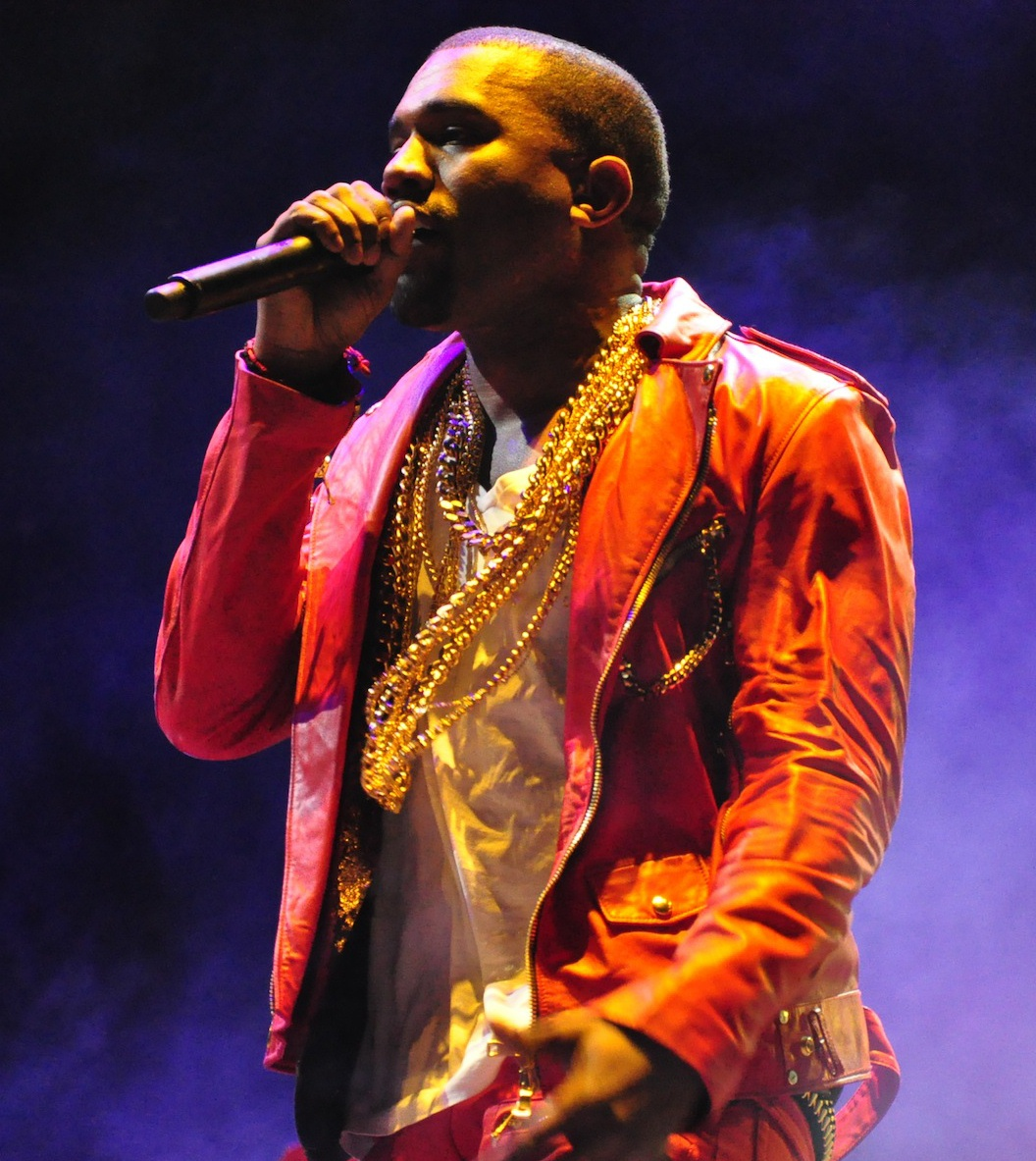
Kanye West is among the personalities who appear in the video.

The short film begins with Kanye West relating objects and people with Los Angeles, including James Dean and Howard Hughes as well as architecture, Walt Disney and Marilyn Monroe. He is followed by a series of commentary from several residents discussing their relationship with Los Angeles while some of the city's most iconic landmarks are shown. From the Hollywood Hills to Hollywood Boulevard, the short film captures the struggle of entertainers from the streets to the big screen.

A homeless man named Haywood opens up, "I didn't know it was the city of angels, I thought it was the lost angels, the city of lost souls." Tomo Miličević follows, explaining that "it's the place where I came and the dreams did come true." Jared Leto confesses, "I wouldn't have anything if it wasn't for this city", while Shannon says, "I came out here and I kind of found a life." Kanye West acknowledges conflicted feelings about Los Angeles, where his mother died and his daughter was born. Recalling her first impressions of the city, Olivia Wilde says, "I thought it was the most magical place I'd ever been. It's the promised land." After the opening sequences, the song "City of Angels" begins, with Thirty Seconds to Mars performing atop the Hollywood Hills overlooking the city.

Clips of Marilyn Monroe, James Dean and Elizabeth Taylor are shown before the music stops with Christopher Lloyd Dennis, a Superman impersonator, who proclaims, "Hollywood is a land of dreams. And it's also a land of broken dreams." Jovan Rameau, a Michael Jackson impersonator, talks about coming to the United States on a boat as a Haitian refugee hoping to achieve the American Dream. He is followed by confessions by several personalities, including a silver man and a porn actress. Haywood explains that he arrived in Los Angeles while searching for his mother, only to find her living on the street. Lindsay Lohan reveals that she disappointed herself, while Selena Gomez addresses the role that Disney has played in her life.

After the second verse of the song begins, childhood pictures of Jared and Shannon with their mother Constance are shown. Takes of the Hollywood Walk of Fame and other confessions follow, including clips from Corey Feldman's early work as a child actor. Feldman discusses how he started working at age three and how his family relied on him to pay the bills. Ashley Olsen opines on the fleeting nature of fame, while Juliette Lewis and James Franco talk about managing dreams and expectations. As the song ends, Christopher Lloyd Dennis sums up, "Do I think I'm gonna make it in the industry? As long as I keep believing, it will happen." The short film ends with the various personalities introducing themselves.

=== Reception ===
"This thing is made of win. What's so amazing about it? It isn't merely the roster of A-listers Leto scored (though that's impressive) or how candid some of the interviewees are about their struggles, it's the sense of inspiration the video leaves in its wake. Leto is clearly a fan of Los Angeles and this is his tribute. 'City of Angels' is no ordinary music video; it's an eleven-and-a-half minute ode to a city where the line between success and broken dreams is razor thin."

— Elina Shatkin from Los Angeles magazine talking about the video.

Upon its release, the video received universal acclaim from contemporary music critics. Lindsey Weber of Vulture called the short film a "strangely moving ode to Los Angeles". Markos Papadatos from Digital Journal rated it an A+ and wrote, "Just when you thought that Jared Leto and Thirty Seconds to Mars cannot possible [sic] get any better, they prove us wrong" with their music video for "City of Angels". He found it "raw and captivating" and felt that "it will certainly move people." Brenna Ehrlich from MTV commented that while the short film "may lack all the majestic animals" featured in the music video for "Up in the Air", "it does have some exotic animals of a different sort: a whole pack of celebrities." Liza Darwin from Nylon magazine opened her review by writing, "There are music videos, and then there are Thirty Seconds to Mars music videos." She stated, "Part documentary, part cinematic music video, this Jared Leto-helmed mini-film is touching, sweet, and totally worth watching in its 11-minute entirety."

Sophie Schillaci, writing for The Hollywood Reporter, noticed the simplicity of the video and lauded its atmosphere. Anna Job from GoldenPlec commented that the "cinematography is notable, featuring panoramic shots of Jared Leto serenading the city from the same perch they used in 'Kings and Queens'." Niki Crux from The Inquisitr gave a positive review and wrote, "Showcasing mini profiles on Hollywood's largest icons, and lowest casualties, Jared Leto shines his camera on every facet that makes up Los Angeles. The video at times feels like a tribute to Los Angeles, but it never glosses over the turmoil that ensues in the City of Angels."

Allison Bowsher from MuchMusic was impressed with the video, calling it a "moving short film". She wrote, "As an ode to Los Angeles, the band brought together what is most simply described as a diverse group of people to talk about their feelings towards the famous city. From street performers to homeless youth to some of the most famous celebrities in the world, Thirty Seconds to Mars compiled a panel that concisely and visually demonstrate the extreme highs and lows of Los Angeles in eleven minutes." Luke O'Neil from MTV noted that "interspersed with the real celebrities are a series of celebrity impersonators, which only heightens the underlying conceit about the fuzzy intersection of dreams and reality. That's the idea of Los Angeles". Emily Wright from The Boston Globe noticed the "raw, personal side to some of today's most popular celebrities" featured. Scott Sterling of CBS News called it a "compelling examination on life in Los Angeles".

On July 17, 2014, the video received a nomination in the category of Best Cinematography at the 2014 MTV Video Music Awards, but lost to "Pretty Hurts" by Beyoncé. It became the second consecutive nomination for cinematographer David Devlin, who also contended in 2013 for "Up in the Air". "City of Angels" received Best Rock Video at the Loudwire Music Awards on February 11, 2014. It was also nominated for Best Video at the 2014 Kerrang! Awards, but lost to "Boston Square" by Deaf Havana.

== Live performances ==
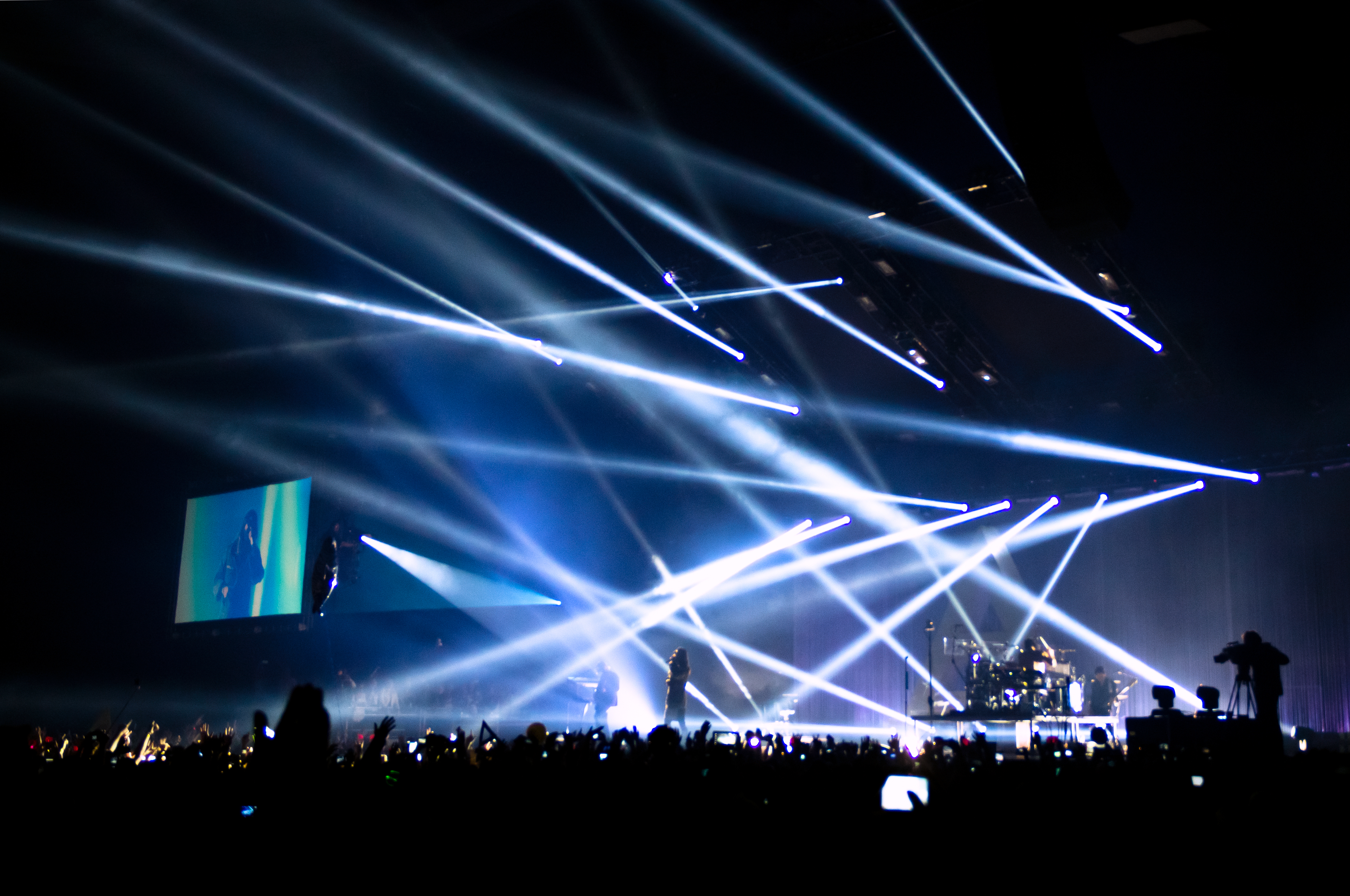
Thirty Seconds to Mars performing in Moscow, Russia in March 2014

"City of Angels" was first performed at special concerts, dubbed as Church of Mars, in May 2013, shortly before the release of the album. It later became a signature part of the Love, Lust, Faith and Dreams Tour which followed. During the tour's first three legs, the song was usually performed with musicians playing taiko drums. The set's video screen displayed shots from the song's music video, which were accompanied by the stage's LED video curtains. Fans and critics responded favorably to the song in a live setting. Curtis Sindrey, writing for the Aesthetic Magazine, opined that the band "turned up the energy" with tracks like "City of Angels". Ben Jolley from the Nottingham Post found it "inspirational", while Jay Cridlin of the Tampa Bay Times called it "epic". Thirty Seconds to Mars performed "City of Angels" at multiple major festivals, including Rock Werchter, Pinkpop, Rock am Ring and Rock im Park, which saw the band playing as headline act.

On May 1, 2014, a piano version of the song was performed at the 1st iHeartRadio Music Awards held at the Shrine Auditorium in Los Angeles. Shannon Leto was not present at the ceremony; the song was performed by Jared Leto and Tomo Miličević, who were stationed on different platforms in front of multiple video screens showing clips from the music video. The performance received a standing ovation from the audience; Jessica Hyndman from MTV deemed it a highlight of the show. A Digital Journal writer commented that the band delivered an "exceptional rendition" of the song and displayed "a great deal of charisma and energy that was equal in excellence to a live U2 performance". "City of Angels" was also included in the Carnivores Tour, a tour on which Thirty Seconds to Mars co-headlined with Linkin Park, and usually appeared approximately halfway through the set.

== Track listing ==
US promo CD single

1. "City of Angels" (Radio Edit) – 4:13
2. "City of Angels" (Album Version) – 5:04

EU promo CD single

1. "City of Angels" (Radio Edit) – 4:18
2. "City of Angels" (Album Version) – 5:02
3. "City of Angels" (Instrumental) – 5:03

Digital download

1. "City of Angels" (Piano Version) – 4:22

Digital download Remix

1. "City of Angels" (Markus Schulz Remix) – 5:00

== Credits and personnel ==
Credits adapted from Love, Lust, Faith and Dreams album liner notes.

- Performed by Thirty Seconds to Mars
- Written by Jared Leto
- Produced by Steve Lillywhite and Jared Leto
- Recorded at The International Centre for the Advancement of the Arts and Sciences of Sound, Los Angeles, California
- Audio engineering by Jamie Reed Schefman
- Mixed by Serban Ghenea
- Engineered for Mix by John Hanes at Mixstar Studios, Virginia Beach, Virginia
- Mastered by Howie Weinberg and Dan Gerbarg at Howie Weinberg Mastering, Los Angeles, California

== Charts ==
=== Weekly charts ===
Weekly chart performance
Chart (2013–14)	Peak position
Australia (ARIA)	93
Belgium (Ultratip Bubbling Under Flanders)	69
Czech Republic (IFPI)	87
Finland Airplay (Radiosoittolista)	32
Germany (GfK)	92
Italy (Musica e dischi)	31
Portugal (AFP)	17
UK Rock & Metal (OCC)	21
US Alternative Songs (Billboard)	8
US Hot Rock Songs (Billboard)	31
US Rock Airplay (Billboard)	18

=== Year-end charts ===
Year-end chart performance
Chart (2013)	Position
US Alternative Songs (Billboard)	37
Chart (2014)	Position
Portugal (AFP)	28

== Certifications ==
Certifications for "City of Angels"
Region	Certification	Certified units/sales
Brazil (Pro-Música Brasil)	Gold	30,000^{‡}
Portugal (AFP)	Gold	10,000^{^}
^{^} Shipments figures based on certification alone.^{‡} Sales+streaming figures based on certification alone.

== Release history ==
Street dates
Region	Date	Format	Label
United States	July 30, 2013	Active rock	Virgin; Capitol
United States	July 30, 2013	Modern rock	Virgin; Capitol
Italy	October 25, 2013	Contemporary hit radio	Universal
Europe	November 11, 2013	Contemporary hit radio	Virgin; Universal
United Kingdom	December 2, 2013	Contemporary hit radio	Polydor
United States	June 30, 2014	Digital download – Remix	Coldharbour
Germany	June 30, 2014	Digital download – Remix	Coldharbour
United Kingdom	June 30, 2014	Digital download – Remix	Coldharbour
United States	July 1, 2014	Digital download	Virgin
Australia	July 18, 2014	Digital download	Virgin
France	July 21, 2014	Digital download	Virgin; Mercury
Germany	July 21, 2014	Digital download	Virgin; Universal
Italy	July 21, 2014	Digital download	Virgin; Universal
Spain	July 21, 2014	Digital download	Virgin; Universal
