= Boulevard Recording =

Recording studio in Hollywood, California

- Genre: Various (alt rock, indie rock, singer-songwriter, jazz, hip-hop, R&B, grunge, etc.)
- Founded: Hollywood, California (2010)
- Founder: Clay Blair
- Headquarters: Hollywood, United States
- Services: Recording studio, music production
- Owner: Clay Blair
- Website: boulevardrecording.com

Boulevard Recording is a recording studio in Hollywood, California that was opened in 2010 under the ownership of producer Clay Blair.

The studio was previously home to the famed Producer's Workshop where Pink Floyd decided to park for two months after they began tracking The Wall in France in 1978. They did all of their overdubs, mixed and mastered the record there.

Artist manager and talent agent Seymour Heller owned Producer's Workshop where it served as Liberace's main studio. During the AVI Records and Heller years, Producer's Workshop was under management by Ed Cobb who served as the label's vice president. Under AVI Records, Le Pamplemousse, Jerry Rix, and Evelyn Thomas recorded disco albums.

Other clients of Producer's Workshop include pop music luminaries Fleetwood Mac who mixed Rumors, Ringo Starr recorded Ringo, Carly Simon recorded Hotcakes and many others. Steely Dan also tracked most of the basic tracks to Aja and Gaucho there.

From 1985 to 2010 it was home to Westbeach Recorders where such artists as NOFX, Blink-182, Bad Religion, Rancid and The Offspring recorded.

Boulevard Recording has hosted Moby, The Pogues, Richard Thompson, Ben Ottewell (of Gomez), Thirty Seconds to Mars for their album Love, Lust, Faith and Dreams, Neko Case, Plan B, Elizabeth and the Catapult, The Cult, Josh Radin, The Romantics, Chris Pierce, Bob Rock, The Pogues, Joe Purdy, and Steve Lillywhite as clients.
