= Up in the Air (song) =

Single by Thirty Seconds to Mars

from the album Love, Lust, Faith and Dreams
- Released: March 18, 2013
- Recorded: The International Centre for the Advancement of the Arts and Sciences of Sound, Los Angeles, California
- Genre: Electronic rock
- Length: 4:37
- Label: Virgin
- Songwriter: Jared Leto
- Producers: Steve Lillywhite; Jared Leto

Thirty Seconds to Mars singles chronology
"Hurricane 2.0" (2010)	"Up in the Air" (2013)	"Do or Die" (2013)

Music video
- "Up in the Air" on YouTube

"Up in the Air" is a song recorded by American rock band Thirty Seconds to Mars, featured on their fourth studio album, Love, Lust, Faith and Dreams (2013). Written by lead vocalist Jared Leto, who also produced the song with Steve Lillywhite, "Up in the Air" is an introspective and passionate track reflecting upon human consciousness. It marked a departure from much of the band's previous work as it incorporates a more electronic-influenced sound as well as elements from new wave music.

"Up in the Air" was released on March 18, 2013, as the lead single from the album. It premiered on the same day from the International Space Station, after being launched aboard a spacecraft loaded with scientific experiments and other equipment. Critical reception to the song was mostly positive, with much of the praise going to its sonic variety and introspective lyrics. The track peaked at number three on the Alternative Songs in the United States and garnered significant commercial outcomes internationally, reaching the top fifteen of Finland, Lebanon, Portugal, and Russia.

The accompanying music video, directed by Leto, features conceptual imagery filled with references to different art forms. It received a largely positive response from critics, who lauded the video's symbolic nature and visuals. It was nominated for numerous accolades, including three awards at the 2013 MTV Video Music Awards, where it won Best Rock Video. Thirty Seconds to Mars performed "Up in the Air" on Jimmy Kimmel Live! and Conan, and included the song on the setlist of their Love, Lust, Faith and Dreams Tour and subsequent Carnivores Tour.

== Recording and composition ==
"Up in the Air" was written by lead vocalist Jared Leto, who also produced the song with Steve Lillywhite. The latter had previously worked with Thirty Seconds to Mars on the production of the band's third studio album, This Is War (2009). The song was engineered by Jamie Reed Schefman and mixed by Serban Ghenea. John Hanes engineered it for mixing at Mixstar Studios in Virginia Beach, Virginia. The track features additional programming by Patrick Nissley. It was recorded at The International Centre for the Advancement of the Arts and Sciences of Sound in Los Angeles, California and mastered by Howie Weinberg and Dan Gerbarg at Howie Weinberg Mastering. The song includes a contribution from the band's fans, credited as the Knights of the White Shadow, who provide additional vocals recorded at the band's studio.

"Up in the Air"
A 25-second sample of "Up in the Air" where the chorus is played, featuring a fast rhythm section and rapid synthesizers.

"Up in the Air" was described as an electronic rock song with new wave-style keyboards. It opens with the sound of guitars, followed by drum beats, "kaleidoscopic" synthesizers and a chanted vocal part. After the first verse, which features a four on the floor pattern, the pre-chorus follows, leading to an anthemic chorus as Jared Leto voices the lines "A thousand times I tempted fate / A thousand times I played this game / A thousand times that I have said today". Kevin Rutherford of CBS Radio called the track a "swift rocker with slight electronic undertones".

Jeff Benjamin from Fuse felt that with its four-on-the-floor beat, "dance-y" synthesizers and trance effects, the song is "crafted for 2013's EDM-obsessed music world". He noticed the piano drama and Leto's melodramatic vocals about the "portrait of a tortured you and I". Ryan Reed from Billboard acknowledged the band's progression, considering the song a departure from the group's previous arena-friendly alternative rock sound.

Kaitlyn Hodnicki from Stature magazine found the "seductive" throbbing beat of the track "completely at ease with Jared's risqué lyrics". Leto described "Up in the Air" as a passionate and energetic song that "feels really free" but also features the concept of constraint and tension, particularly evident in the line "I'll wrap my hands around your neck so tight with love". Leto explained that the lyric plays on two different levels, giving a sexual connotation to the line, but also the idea of power and control. He further said that the song "has to do with getting to a point in your life where you're ready to let go of the past, embrace change and become more of who you really are".

== Release ==
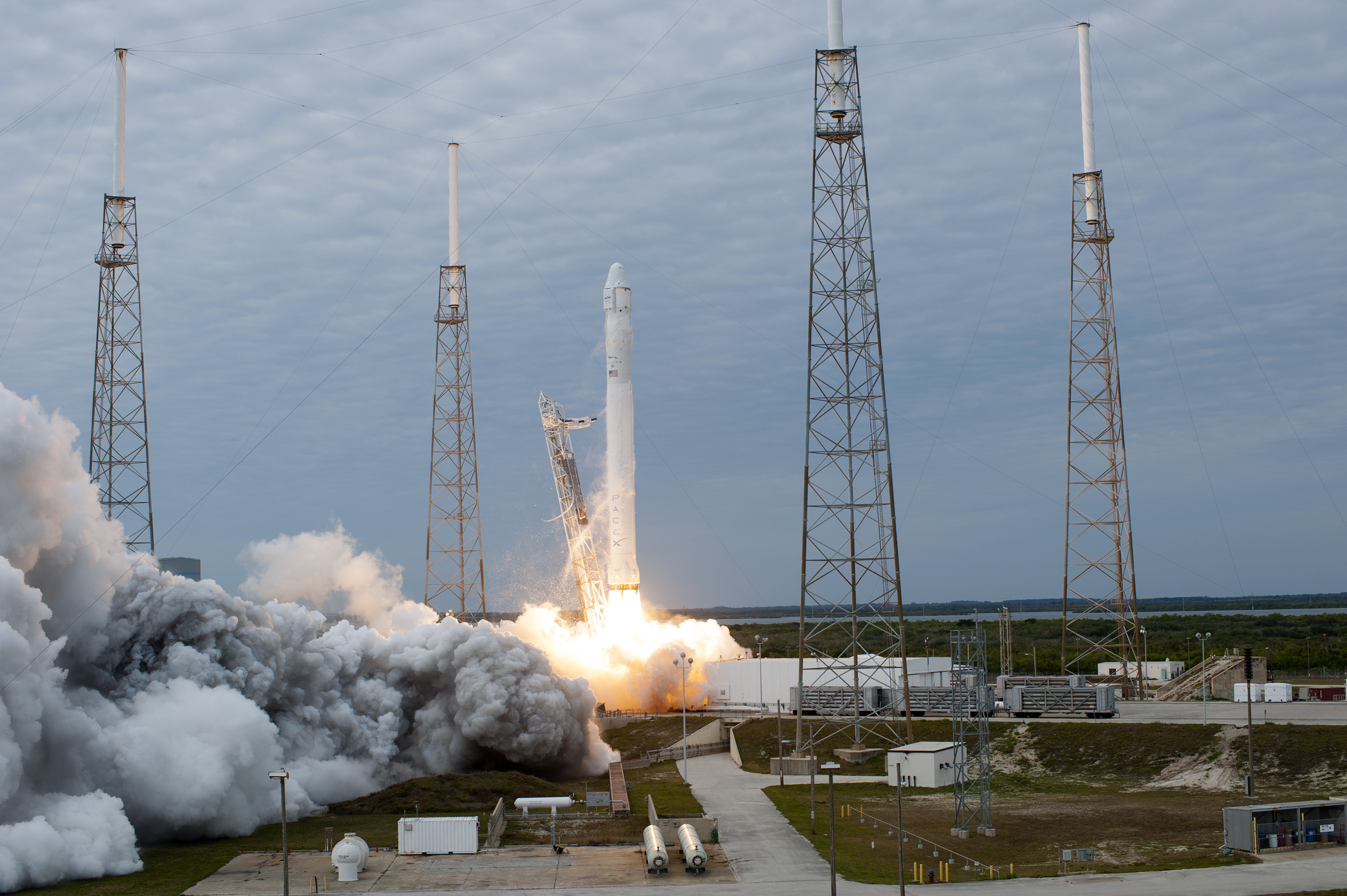
The SpaceX CRS-2 Falcon 9 launching on March 1, 2013

In February 2013, Thirty Seconds to Mars announced that "Up in the Air" would be the lead single from their fourth studio album Love, Lust, Faith and Dreams (2013). In partnership with NASA, Thirty Seconds to Mars launched the first copy of "Up in the Air" aboard the Dragon spacecraft on SpaceX CRS-2. The spacecraft carried a capsule loaded with more than 1,200 pounds of scientific experiments, equipment and the first copy of the song. The mission was launched from the Cape Canaveral Air Force Station atop a Falcon 9 rocket on March 1, 2013. On March 18, 2013, the single premiered from the International Space Station, after a Q&A session with the band and astronaut Thomas Marshburn that was broadcast worldwide on NASA TV and VyRT. Annise Parker, mayor of the city of Houston, proclaimed March 18 the Thirty Seconds to Mars Day. City Councilman James Rodriguez presented the proclamation to the band prior to their arrival at NASA.

Jared Leto told MTV News that with the launch of the song into space the band wanted to start the new chapter of their career in an "appropriately massive manner". He explained, "I had been speaking with NASA for quite some time about ways to find something creative to do together. And I presented them with this idea and here we are." He described the experience as "phenomenal" and "mind-blowing". "Up in the Air" made its radio debut on March 18 and became commercially available for downloading the following day.

== Critical reception ==
"Up in the Air" garnered mostly positive reviews from music critics. Kyle Anderson, writing for Entertainment Weekly, called the song a "throbbing modern-rock anthem" which offers "visceral, hands-up hedonism". Lewis Corner from Digital Spy gave "Up in the Air" four stars out of five and commented that the band manages to retain its "trademark lad-rock sound while rejuvenating it with chart-friendly electronics". Ryan Reed from Billboard echoed this sentiment, praising the sonic variety of the song. Emily Zemler, also writing for Billboard, cited the track as the best showcase for the "expansively epic tone" of the album. Chris Maguire of AltSounds regarded "Up in the Air" as the "perfect choice" for lead single, labelling it an "excellent" track. Johan Wippsson of Melodic magazine chose it as a highlight on Love, Lust, Faith and Dreams, and commended its "bombastic and huge choruses". Brent Faulkner from PopMatters called "Up in the Air" an enjoyable song and praised Leto's introspective lyrics. Writing for Stature magazine, Kaitlyn Hodnicki opined that the song is "littered" with choruses that "will sound epic live".

Joseph Atilano from the Philippine Daily Inquirer gave the song a positive review, noticing the band's tendency to "explore and employ technological advances to diversify their sound and to keep them from becoming too predictable". Adam Silverstein of Digital Spy named it a stand-out track from the album and felt that songs like "Up in the Air" "power up the vibe". John Watt from Drowned in Sound wrote that the track "briefly crackles with life". He noticed the song's verses driven forward by a "barrage of pulsing synths" and "Leto's emotive wail", but felt that the chorus was a "stuck round" which failed to "set the song alight". Dan Slessor of Alternative Press wrote that the track sounded "just too easy" for the distinctive sound of the band. Andy Baber from musicOMH felt that "Up in the Air" continues the "pulsating start" to the album, noticing Leto's "emotive wailings" abounding over "throbbing synths". Tamar Anitai of MTV regarded the song as one of the band's most complex and evocative works.

== Commercial performance ==
In the United States, "Up in the Air" debuted at number 13 on the Alternative Songs chart on April 6, 2013. It became the greatest gainer of the issue, after reaching six million listeners on more than sixty radio stations over its first week, according to Billboard. After ten weeks the song moved to number three, which became its peak. It was held out of the top spot by "Safe and Sound" by Capital Cities and "Sweater Weather" by the Neighbourhood. The song entered the Rock Airplay chart at number nine. It moved to number four on June 1, 2013, and held the spot for three consecutive weeks. On the issue dated April 6, 2013, "Up in the Air" debuted on the Bubbling Under Hot 100 Singles chart at number seven.

"Up in the Air" reached a peak of number 45 on the UK Singles Chart and number 34 on the Scottish Singles Chart. Following the album release, the song rose to number 12 in Portugal and was the 20th best-selling single of 2013. It has since been certified gold by the Associação Fonográfica Portuguesa (AFP), denoting sales of over 10,000 units throughout the country. The track debuted at number four in Russia and reached number seven in Lebanon. In Finland, according to Nielsen SoundScan, the high digital sales placed the song at number ten on the national record chart. "Up in the Air" also peaked in the top 50 on several national record charts, including Spain, Austria, Germany and the Netherlands.

== Music video ==
=== Development ===
On January 30, 2013, Thirty Seconds to Mars posted on their website a casting call for extras and off-road vehicles, announcing that they were preparing to shoot a short film for "Up in the Air". The shooting took place from February 7–9 in Long Beach, California at an aerospace manufacturing building. The video was directed by Jared Leto under his Dr. Seuss-inspired pseudonym Bartholomew Cubbins. After filming, Leto revealed that the short film includes art from Damien Hirst, whose painting Isonicotinic Acid Ethyl Ester (2010–11) appears on the cover of Love, Lust, Faith and Dreams. In an interview with MTV News, he unveiled that the crew recruited scores of extras and a number of surrealist street performers to appear in the video. However, he did not reveal much about its concept. The short film was produced by Jared Leto and Emma Ludbrook through Sisyphus Corporation. It was edited by Leto, Eric Greenburg, Matt Briones, and Forrest Borie. Devid Levlin served as director of photography.

A lyric video for "Up in the Air" was released on March 20, 2013 on Vevo. It features footage taken from the International Space Station as it orbits Earth. Upon release, James Montgomery from MTV commented that the band "has definitely helped move the lyric video concept forward". He wrote, "filled with eye-popping time-lapse photography [...] the clip skims along the surface of the earth, providing the viewer with unbelievable images of aurorae borealis, lightning storms and vast grids of twinkling city lights". The following day, Thirty Seconds to Mars teased a preview of the short film. After several weeks of editing, the band premiered the video for "Up in the Air" on April 19, 2013. It was preceded by a series of teasers released through the week.

=== Concept ===
Damien Hirst's reference seen throughout the music video

The short film for "Up in the Air" features a montage of symbolic imagery using quick-hitting shots. It includes burlesque dancer Dita Von Teese riding a mechanical bull, gymnasts Jordyn Wieber and McKayla Maroney showing off their abilities, performers from Cirque du Soleil, and an assorted array of individuals. It also features a colored chalk fight and a number of animals. Jared Leto described the video as a "celebration of art and movement". He further referred to it as a "bizarre and hallucinogenic journey through an incredibly surreal landscape". The short film also features the concept of anti-dancing, which Leto regarded as a way through which the gymnasts' artistry and abilities manifest themselves. He explained, "I really wanted to capture the artistry and the commitment of what these girls do. What they're able to do with their bodies is just unreal. It's incredible. Flawless. [...] You can see the dedication, the time, the energy, the work."

Writing for MTV, Tamar Anitai found the video "highly conceptual" and noted that beyond the "hypnagogic imagery" and "expensive gallery pieces", the underlying meaning of the short film seems to be "finding the beauty in the bizarre" and the "tension of power dynamics". She felt that Leto created a "surreal visual fantasia" and interpreted the colored chalk fight near the end of the video as a "call to make art, not war". James Montgomery of MTV wrote that although "every frame is like a photograph [...] they are all intrinsically linked". He felt that when combined, the singular images form a "powerfully cohesive unit", explaining that "they tell a story, convey emotions (lust, loss, sadness, desire, anger, etc) without speaking a word". Chad Childers from Loudwire commented that the meaning of the video is left open to the viewer's interpretation.

=== Response and accolades ===
The video received highly positive response from music critics. RJ Cubarrubia from Rolling Stone commented that Leto tapped into his cinematic spirit creating a series of "striking visuals" connected by the "extravagant" track. In his review for Loudwire, Chad Childers labelled it a "decadent" short film that "definitely does capture the eye". Tamar Anitai from MTV was impressed with the video and praised the visual experience, calling it a "living, breathing, spectacular art installation". John Longbottom from Kerrang! magazine regarded the short film as one of the "finest works" by Thirty Seconds to Mars, calling it "simply colossal". Contactmusic.com felt that the "stunning" video is a "sublime return to form". Hayley Avron from the website found Dita Von Teese's appearance "steamy". Writing for MTV, James Montgomery commented that the video "speeds along on striking visuals — bright colors, sinewy bodies, vast expanses, prowling beasts — and Leto's deft directorial choices". Steven Gottlieb from VideoStatic opined that the short film is "massive in every way", praising its production. Emily Zempler, writing for The Hollywood Reporter, called the video "expansive" and "lavish", and lauded its dramatic visual imagery. Joseph Atilano from the Philippine Daily Inquirer commended its concept "full of images that represent deep emotions and various states of mind — all of which would get our brains working". Bethany Lee from 106.3 The Buzz found it "interesting and mesmerizing to watch". He deemed Von Teese's appearance a highlight of the short film.

On July 17, 2013, the video received three nominations at the 2013 MTV Video Music Awards in the categories of Best Art Direction, Best Cinematography, and Best Rock Video. It went on to win the latter. At the 2013 MTV Europe Music Awards, it was nominated for Best Video. "Up in the Air" also garnered nominations for the MTV Video Music Award Japan for Best Group Video and the Kerrang! Award for Best Video. It competed at the 2013 Camerimage, where it was nominated for Best Music Video and Best Cinematography in a Music Video.

== Live performances ==
"Up in the Air" was first performed at special concerts, dubbed as Church of Mars, in May 2013, shortly before the release of the album. It later became a signature part of the opening stages of the Love, Lust, Faith and Dreams Tour which followed, usually appearing as the ultimate song or during the encore. Throughout the tour, Jared Leto chose audience members to join Thirty Seconds to Mars on stage for "Up in the Air". The song was later moved to the beginning of the setlist as a set opener along with "O Fortuna", a movement from Carl Orff's scenic cantata Carmina Burana. Fans and critics responded favorably to the song in a live setting. Danny Crandall of The Sun Chronicle commended the theatrics of the performance, while Grace Carroll from Gigwise noted that until the last note of the song, Leto had the audience "completely in the palm of his hand".

"Up in the Air" was performed on Jimmy Kimmel Live! on May 21, 2013, where the band also played "Kings and Queens" from This Is War. A CBS Radio writer commented that the performance "blew everybody away". On May 22, 2013, the song was performed on Conan. Thirty Seconds to Mars performed "Up in the Air" at multiple major festivals, including Rock Werchter, Pinkpop, Download, Rock am Ring and Rock im Park, which saw the band playing as headline act. The song was also included in the Carnivores Tour, a tour on which Thirty Seconds to Mars co-headlined with Linkin Park, and usually appeared at the beginning of the set.

== Track listing ==
Digital download
No.	Title	Length
1.	"Up in the Air"	4:37

== Credits and personnel ==
Recording and management

- Recorded at The International Centre for the Advancement of the Arts and Sciences of Sound, Los Angeles, California
- Engineered for Mix at Mixstar Studios, Virginia Beach, Virginia
- Mastered at Howie Weinberg Mastering, Los Angeles, California
- Published by Apocraphex Music (ASCAP) / Universal Music – Z Tunes, LLC (ASCAP)
- All rights administered by Universal Music – Z Tunes, LLC

Personnel

- Thirty Seconds to Mars – primary artist
- Jared Leto – songwriter, producer
- Steve Lillywhite – producer
- Knights of the White Shadow – additional vocals
- Jamie Reed Schefman – audio engineering
- Patrick Nissley – additional programming
- Serban Ghenea – audio mixing
- John Hanes – mix engineering
- Howie Weinberg – audio mastering
- Dan Gerbarg – audio mastering

Credits adapted from Love, Lust, Faith and Dreams album liner notes.

== Charts ==
=== Weekly charts ===
Weekly chart performance for "Up in the Air"
Chart (2013)	Peak position
Australia (ARIA)	68
Austria (Ö3 Austria Top 40)	45
Belgium (Ultratip Bubbling Under Flanders)	42
Belgium (Ultratip Bubbling Under Wallonia)	37
Canada Rock (Billboard)	50
Czech Republic (Rádio Top 100)	51
France (SNEP)	76
Germany (GfK)	47
Ireland (IRMA)	83
Lebanon (Lebanese Top 20)	7
Mexico Ingles Airplay (Billboard)	29
Netherlands (Dutch Top 40)	49
Portugal (AFP)	12
Scotland Singles (OCC)	34
South Korea (Gaon)	72
Spain (PROMUSICAE)	42
Ukraine Airplay (TopHit)	172
UK Singles (OCC)	45
UK Airplay (Music Week)	46
US Bubbling Under Hot 100 (Billboard)	7
US Hot Rock & Alternative Songs (Billboard)	16
US Rock & Alternative Airplay (Billboard)	4

=== Year-end charts ===
Year-end chart performance for "Up in the Air"
Chart (2013)	Position
Portugal (AFP)	20
Ukraine Airplay (TopHit)	110
US Hot Rock Songs (Billboard)	42
US Rock Airplay (Billboard)	21

== Certifications ==
Certifications for "Up in the Air"
Region	Certification	Certified units/sales
Brazil (Pro-Música Brasil)	Gold	30,000^{‡}
Portugal (AFP)	Gold	10,000^{^}
^{^} Shipments figures based on certification alone.^{‡} Sales+streaming figures based on certification alone.

== Release history ==
Release dates and formats for "Up in the Air"
Region	Date	Format	Label
Canada	March 18, 2013	Digital download	Virgin
United States	March 18, 2013	Digital download	Virgin
Italy	March 18, 2013	Contemporary hit radio	Universal
France	March 19, 2013	Digital download	Virgin; Mercury
Germany	March 19, 2013	Digital download	Virgin; Universal
Italy	March 19, 2013	Digital download	Virgin; Universal
Spain	March 19, 2013	Digital download	Virgin; Universal
United Kingdom	March 19, 2013	Digital download	Virgin; Polydor
United States	March 19, 2013	Modern rock	Virgin; Capitol
Australia	March 20, 2013	Digital download	Virgin
United States	April 8, 2013	Active rock	Virgin; Capitol
