= Love, Lust, Faith and Dreams =

Studio album by Thirty Seconds to Mars
- Released: May 17, 2013
- Recorded: April–December 2012
- Studios: The International Centre for the Advancement of the Arts and Sciences of Sound (Los Angeles, California)
- Genres: Experimental rock; art rock; electronic rock
- Length: 44:52
- Labels: Virgin; Immortal
- Producers: Jared Leto; Steve Lillywhite

Thirty Seconds to Mars chronology
MTV Unplugged (2011)	Love, Lust, Faith and Dreams (2013)	America (2018)

Singles from Love, Lust, Faith and Dreams
- 1. "Up in the Air" Released: March 19, 2013; 2. "Do or Die" Released: July 1, 2013; 3. "City of Angels" Released: November 11, 2013

Love, Lust, Faith and Dreams (stylized as LOVE LUST FAITH + DREAMS) is the fourth studio album by American rock band Thirty Seconds to Mars, released through Virgin Records in the Netherlands on May 17, 2013, in the UK on May 20 and in the US on May 21. It was their first album in four years, following This Is War (2009), as well as their last album released through Virgin and Immortal. It is also the final album to be released under the Immortal Records label, although it went defunct in 2007.

The record carries the concept album format of This Is War and expands the spectrum to revolve around the themes after which it is named. Its sound follows the experimental direction found on some of the band's previous work, incorporating elements of art rock and electronic music. The album was promoted with three singles, "Up in the Air", "Do or Die", and "City of Angels", two of which managed to chart within the top ten on the US Alternative Songs chart.

Upon release, the album was generally favorably received by critics, who called it a return to form for the band. It was the group's second consecutive nomination for the Echo Music Prize. The album debuted at number 6 on the Billboard 200, becoming the band's first top ten album on the chart, and reached the top ten in more than fifteen countries, including the United Kingdom, Canada, Australia, and Germany.

== Background and recording ==
In 2009, Thirty Seconds to Mars released their third studio album This Is War. The album saw a new direction taken by the band, employing darker lyrical themes, a louder sound and "much more electronic and experimental, with lots of vintage synths." This Is War has since sold over four million albums and one million singles solicited from the album worldwide, making the album the band's most commercially successful so far. The tour that followed, the Into the Wild Tour, Hurricane Tour and Closer to the Edge Tour, spanned two years and broke the Guinness World Record for the "Longest Concert Tour by a Rock Band", playing a total of 309 shows.

To follow up This Is War, the band began to work on their fourth studio album immediately after the conclusion of the Closer to the Edge Tour. Frontman Jared Leto wanted "an album that has ebb and flow and content and structure.", a sharp contrast to the band's previous work. Leto began writing for the album in December 2011, and by the time the band started the recording sessions for Love, Lust, Faith and Dreams in April 2012, he had amassed a total of 50 songs.

On April 23, 2012, Rolling Stone released an article revealing that Thirty Seconds to Mars was currently in the studio recording a fourth LP. According to the article, the band previewed some of the new material in their April 27 VyRT stream, including a song called "Witness". It also stated that they were interested in working with other artists for the album. The band's official Twitter account confirmed this news. On April 25, 2012, MTV Buzzworthy confirmed that they are working with famed record producer Steve Lillywhite, who had previously worked with U2, Peter Gabriel, and The Killers, among others.

The recording sessions for Love, Lust, Faith + Dreams took place from April to December 2012, at the Laboratory in Los Angeles. In September 2012, "The Summit", an event where fans are invited to contribute chorus vocals to tracks on the album and previously held to record choral vocals for This Is War in 2009, was held. Unlike This Is War, where an entire audience-sized crowd took part in the recording, the summit that took place for the recording of Love, Lust Faith and Dreams was more stripped-down and organic, with only 20 to 25 people contributing vocals to the record.

== Concept ==
Love, Lust, Faith and Dreams
All four of the introductions, as heard in Love, Lust, Faith and Dreams.

Love, Lust, Faith and Dreams is a concept album revolving around the themes after which the album is named. The album is divided into four segments, each named Love, Lust, Faith and Dreams, respectively, with the beginning of each segment declared by a female voice proclaiming the name of the segment before the beginning of a song or at the end of an interlude which introduces the next segment of the album.

A more specific album concept can be seen inside the CD. It is recognized by four colors, with the color red standing for Love, yellow for Lust, green for Faith, and blue for Dreams. LOVE contains "Birth" and "Conquistador". LUST contains "Up in the Air", "City of Angels", "The Race", "End of All Days" and "Pyres of Varanasi". FAITH contains "Bright Lights", "Do or Die" and "Convergence". DREAMS contains "Northern Lights", and "Depuis Le Début".

Stylistically, Love, Lust, Faith and Dreams has been described as experimental rock, electronic rock, and art rock.

== Packaging ==
The artwork for Love, Lust, Faith and Dreams features Damien Hirst's 2011 gloss-on-canvas work, entitled "Isonicotinic Acid Ethyl Ester". The painting is part of Hirst's spot painting series. It has also been announced that a second piece of artwork from Hirst, a signwriting-on-canvas piece entitled "Monochromatic Sectors from Primary, Secondary & Tertiary Colour Ring, Dark Centre" will appear inside the booklet of the Compact Disc version of the album. This art is actually featured on the CD itself.

== Promotion ==
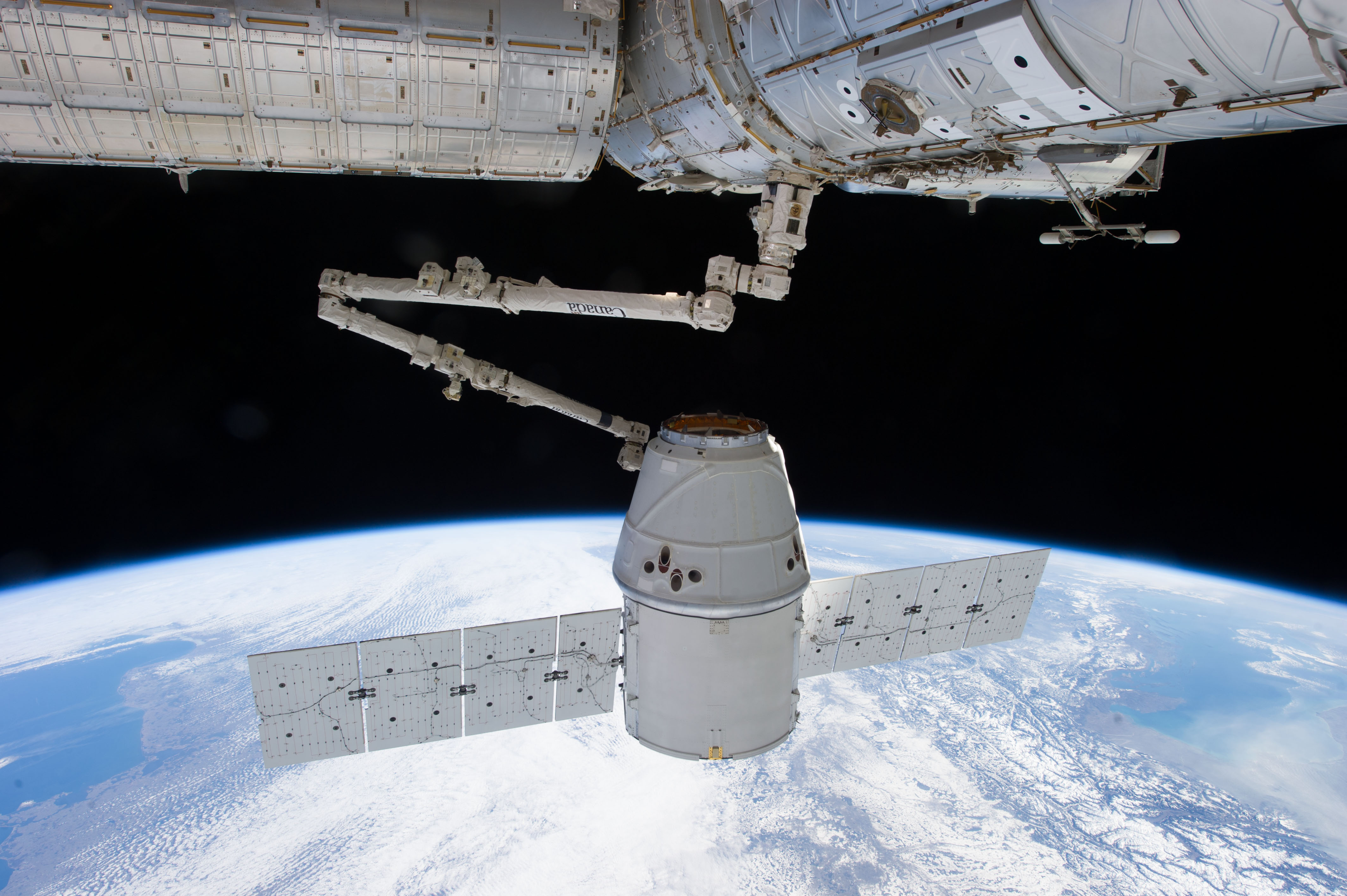
A CD copy of "Up in the Air" was sent to the International Space Station aboard SpaceX CRS-2.

Early promotion for the album during its latter recording stages were two programs on the online premium Streaming media website VyRT, a service which was founded by the band themselves in the latter stages of the This Is War album cycle. The two programs, The Mars Laboratory and The Mars Laboratory II showed members of VyRT an insight into the band's activity during the recording of the album and also debuted acoustic versions of brand new songs from Love, Lust, Faith and Dreams. The Mars Laboratory aired on April 27, 2012 while The Mars Laboratory II aired during post-production of the album on December 1, 2012.

On May 2, 2013, the band's Twitter hashtag, "#MARSmay21st", successfully reached the worldwide trending hashtags on the social platform. As a way of saying thanks to their fans, the band released the lyric video for "Conquistador" on Vevo the same day, two weeks before the album's release.

=== Singles ===
"Up in the Air" was released as the lead single from Love, Lust, Faith and Dreams on March 19, 2013. It was announced it would be the first single from the new album on February 28 via Twitter. A CD copy of the single was sent to NASA and SpaceX for launch aboard the Dragon spacecraft on SpaceX CRS-2. The mission was launched atop a Falcon 9 rocket on March 1, 2013, sending the first ever commercial copy of music into space. The spacecraft berthed and docked with the International Space Station on March 3, 2013, making the single available to play by the Expedition 35 crew aboard the station. The song made its worldwide debut aboard the station on March 18, 2013, and was released as a Digital download single on iTunes the next day. The music video was released on April 19, 2013, worldwide on Vevo.

"City of Angels" was sent to US Modern rock radio as a promotional single from Love, Lust, Faith and Dreams on July 23, 2013. A music video for "City of Angels", featuring Bartholomew Cubbins as director, was released onto YouTube on October 29, 2013. It was shot over two days on August 18 and 19, 2013, in Los Angeles, California.

Despite not being released as an official single, "Conquistador" was used in a trailer promoting the upcoming video game WWE 2K14.

"Do or Die" was released as a promotional single from Love, Lust, Faith and Dreams on September 9, 2013, in Europe. During the Summer European Tour, Jared confirmed the band was recording footage for a live video for the song. The music video was released on August 5, 2013, worldwide on Vevo.

== Critical reception ==
Professional ratings
Aggregate scores
Source	Rating
Metacritic	62/100
Review scores
Source	Rating
AllMusic	3.5/5 stars
Alternative Press	3/5 stars
Billboard	4/5 stars
Entertainment Weekly	A–
Kerrang!	4/5 stars
PopMatters	6/10
Q	2/5 stars
Rock Sound	8/10
Sound & Vision	4/5 stars
Uncut	2/5 stars

Love, Lust, Faith and Dreams received generally positive reviews from music critics. At Metacritic, which assigns a normalized rating out of 100 to reviews from mainstream critics, the album received an average score of 62, based on 11 reviews. Emily Zemler from Billboard praised the stylistic variety and experimentation, writing that the album "invests itself fully and artfully in its own vision" infused with "an even fuller sense of grandeur than heard on past releases", and "offers an opportunity to explore the boundaries of rock". AllMusic senior editor Stephen Thomas Erlewine acknowledged the band's musical adventurousness, describing the record as "galvanized for the present, pushing its thick processed guitars, chanted choruses, and clanging keyboards to the forefront, flirting with taboos underneath its shining surface". He felt that the group's "loosening of their stylistic confines" results in their "boldest, brightest, most imaginative record". Andy Ritchie of Rock Sound complimented Jared Leto's vocal performance and the group's musicianship, praising the "massive choruses" and "titanic climaxes," and stated that the album reaffirms that Thirty Seconds to Mars is in a class of its own. In a four-and-a-half star review, Ryan Jones of Alternative Addiction commended the album's lyrical content and musical style, calling the new sounds "deep and plush", and wrote that the "entire record feels like an amazing journey".

Ian Winwood, writing for Kerrang!, found the album "lavish but not cloying, expansive yet often economical, approachable without being familiar", calling it a "release that defies genre" and deeming it as a "grand achievement befitting this most grandiose of bands". Kyle Anderson of Entertainment Weekly gave the record an "A−", writing that it displays "throbbing modern-rock anthems" which "offer visceral, hands-up hedonism", although he found the album's narrative inexplicable. Dan Slessor of Alternative Press commended the band's capacity for writing "titanic choruses full of sweeping drama in a manner that is almost untouchable", but felt that with "shorter songs and more restrained production" the album lacks the "epic quality" of its predecessor This Is War. In his review for Sound & Vision, Ken Richardson noticed the band's ambition and commended the album's concept. Brent Faulkner of PopMatters gave a mixed response, stating that the album has "its finer moments as well as moments that are overwrought, overextended, and overproduced". Q magazine found it "empty in the extreme", while Uncut called it "wildly overcooked and deeply derivative". John Watt from Drowned in Sound wrote that the album "is a disappointingly tepid affair". Andy Baber of musicOMH felt that the record descends into "something of a mess" despite "starting with what sounded like a clear direction".

== Accolades ==
Love, Lust, Faith and Dreams was named one of the best albums of 2013 by a number of publications, including Alternative Addiction (number two), Melodic (no order), and Under the Radar (number six). It was ranked as the best album of the year by The Scene Magazine, with critic Shayla Miller writing, "This album’s flow is top-notch, making it quite a neat experience. It’s meant to be listened to as a whole. It is a complete piece of music, and it’s breathtaking." The singles "Up in the Air", "Do or Die", and "City of Angels" were included in 91X's year-end top songs list at number 44, 39 and 33, respectively. Love, Lust, Faith and Dreams received a nomination in the category of Best International Rock/Alternative at the 2014 Echo Awards, but lost to Outlaw Gentlemen & Shady Ladies by Volbeat. It was the band's second consecutive nomination for the Echo Music Prize. Love, Lust, Faith and Dreams was nominated for Best Album at the 2014 World Music Awards, but lost to Coup d'Etat by G-Dragon. The album also earned the band the MTV Europe Music Award for Best Alternative in two consecutive years in 2013 and 2014.

== Commercial performance ==
In the United States, Love, Lust, Faith and Dreams debuted at number six on the Billboard 200, selling 53,000 copies in its first week of release according to Nielsen SoundScan. It became the band's first album to reach the top ten of the chart and was also their second-largest sales week in the nation, behind their 2009 album This Is War which opened with 69,000 copies. The album entered both the Billboard's Alternative Albums and Rock Albums charts at number three. It also debuted at number six on the magazine's Tastemaker Albums. In March 2014, it re-entered the Billboard 200 at number 25 with sales of over 186,000 copies, following a promotion by the iTunes Store. By the end of 2013, Love, Lust, Faith and Dreams was included among the best-selling rock albums of the year. As of 2016, the album has sold 394,000 copies in the US.

In the United Kingdom, Love, Lust, Faith and Dreams entered the UK Albums Chart at number five and debuted at the top spot of the UK Rock & Metal Albums Chart, the first album by the band to debut on the chart and secure their first UK Number 1. During its first week, the songs "Conquistador" and "City of Angels" appeared in lower regions of the rock chart due to strong digital sales from the album. In December 2013, Love, Lust, Faith and Dreams was certified silver by the British Phonographic Industry (BPI), followed by Gold in 2023. In Australia, the album entered the ARIA Charts at number four with first week sales of 4,814 copies. In Russia, it debuted at number five, earning a gold certification in its first week of sales.

In Portugal, Love, Lust, Faith and Dreams debuted at number three behind Daft Punk's Random Access Memories and The National's Trouble Will Find Me. After fluctuating down the chart, the album reached the top spot on the issue dated July 15, 2013 and was certified two-times platinum by the Associação Fonográfica Portuguesa (AFP), with sales of over 40,000 copies. In Germany, the album debuted at number three and has since been certified gold by the Bundesverband Musikindustrie (BVMI), denoting shipments of over 100,000 units throughout the country. Love, Lust, Faith and Dreams also reached the top ten in Austria, Italy, Poland, Switzerland, Canada, Finland, Norway, Spain, Czech Republic, Estonia, and Ireland.

== Track listing ==
All tracks are written by Jared Leto, except where noted.

No.	Title	Length
1.	"Birth"	2:07
2.	"Conquistador"	3:12
3.	"Up in the Air"	4:36
4.	"City of Angels"	5:02
5.	"The Race"	3:40
6.	"End of All Days"	4:46
7.	"Pyres of Varanasi"	3:12
8.	"Bright Lights"	4:51
9.	"Do or Die"	4:08
10.	"Convergence" (Shannon Leto)	2:01
11.	"Northern Lights"	4:44
12.	"Depuis le début"	2:33
Total length:		44:52

Love, Lust, Faith and Dreams – Japan bonus track
No.	Title	Length
13.	"Night of the Hunter" (Shannon Leto remix)	6:28
Total length:		51:20

Love, Lust, Faith and Dreams – Deluxe edition (DVD)
No.	Title	Length
1.	"Mars 300: Tribus Centum Numerarae"	35:54
2.	"Paris"	2:53
3.	"Middle East"	3:37
Total length:		42:24

== Credits and personnel ==
Credits adapted from Love, Lust, Faith and Dreams album liner notes.

- Thirty Seconds to Mars – primary artist
- Irving Azoff – management
- Lenny Beer – management
- Clay Blair – mix engineering (track 2)
- Delbert Bowers – mixing assistant (tracks 5–6)
- Bartholomew Cubbins – photography
- Deepak – vocals (track 7)
- David Devlin – photography
- Cory Enemy – additional programming (track 5)
- Chris Galland – mixing assistant (tracks 5–6)
- Dan Gerbarg – audio mastering
- Şerban Ghenea – audio mixing (tracks 3–4, 9)
- John Hanes – mix engineering (tracks 3–4, 9)
- Damien Hirst – art direction, design
- Tony Hoffer – audio mixing (track 8)
- Michael Joyce – additional programming (track 1)
- Morgan Kibby – additional programming (track 8)
- Knights of the White Shadow – additional vocals
- Dennis Lavinthal – management
- Jared Leto – producer, audio mixing (tracks 1, 7, 10–12), art direction, design, photography
- Steve Lillywhite – producer (tracks 2–5), audio mixing (track 2)
- Cameron Lister – mixing assistant (track 8)
- Manny Marroquin – audio mixing (tracks 5–6)
- Alexandra Morton – art direction, design
- Patrick Nissley – additional programming (track 3)
- Jacob Plant – additional programming (track 6)
- Jamie Reed Schefman – audio mixing (tracks 1, 7, 10–12), audio engineering
- Howie Weinberg – audio mastering
- Zhu Zhu – additional vocals

== Charts ==
=== Weekly charts ===
Weekly chart performance for Love, Lust, Faith and Dreams
Chart (2013–14)	Peak position
Australian Albums (ARIA)	4
Austrian Albums (Ö3 Austria)	3
Belgian Albums (Ultratop Flanders)	15
Belgian Albums (Ultratop Wallonia)	12
Canadian Albums (Billboard)	6
Czech Albums (ČNS IFPI)	7
Danish Albums (Hitlisten)	14
Dutch Albums (Album Top 100)	12
Estonian Albums (ERR)	7
Finnish Albums (Suomen virallinen lista)	6
French Albums (SNEP)	16
German Albums (Offizielle Top 100)	3
Greek Albums (IFPI Greece)	17
Hungarian Albums (MAHASZ)	15
Irish Albums (IRMA)	7
Italian Albums (FIMI)	3
Japanese Albums (Oricon)	53
South Korean Albums (Circle)	39
New Zealand Albums (RMNZ)	11
Norwegian Albums (VG-lista)	6
Polish Albums (ZPAV)	5
Portuguese Albums (AFP)	1
Russian Albums (NFPF)	3
Scottish Albums (Official Charts)	5
Slovenian Albums (SLO)	17
Spanish Albums (Promusicae)	6
Swedish Albums (Sverigetopplistan)	36
Swiss Albums (Schweizer Hitparade)	5
UK Albums (Official Charts)	5
UK Rock & Metal Albums (OCC)	1
US Billboard 200	6
US Top Alternative Albums (Billboard)	3
US Top Rock Albums (Billboard)	3

=== Year-end charts ===
Year-end chart performance for Love, Lust, Faith and Dreams
Chart (2013)	Position
Austrian Albums (Ö3 Austria)	56
Belgian Albums (Ultratop Flanders)	168
Belgian Albums (Ultratop Wallonia)	150
German Albums (Offizielle Top 100)	78
Italian Albums (FIMI)	80
Portugal (AFP)	34
UK Albums (OCC)	150
US Rock Albums (Billboard)	71

== Certifications ==
Certifications for Love, Lust, Faith and Dreams
Region	Certification	Certified units/sales
Austria (IFPI Austria)	Gold	7,500^{*}
Brazil (Pro-Música Brasil)	Gold	20,000^{*}
Germany (BVMI)	Gold	100,000^{^}
Italy (FIMI)	Gold	25,000^{*}
Poland (ZPAV)	Gold	10,000^{*}
Portugal (AFP)	2× Platinum	30,000^{^}
Romania (AIMR)	Gold	
Russia (NFPF)	Platinum	10,000^{*}
South Africa (RISA)	Gold	20,000^{*}
United Kingdom (BPI)	Gold	100,000^{‡}
^{*} Sales figures based on certification alone.^{^} Shipments figures based on certification alone.^{‡} Sales+streaming figures based on certification alone.

== See also ==
- List of certified albums in Romania
