= Love, Lust, Faith and Dreams Tour =

2013–15 concert tour by Thirty Seconds to Mars

- World tour by Thirty Seconds to Mars
- Location: Europe • Africa • Asia • Oceania • North America • South America
- Associated album: Love, Lust, Faith and Dreams
- Start date: June 5, 2013
- End date: September 30, 2015
- Legs: 13
- No. of shows: 103 in Europe; 33 in North America; 11 in South America; 4 in Oceania; 5 in Asia; 2 in Africa; 158 in total

Thirty Seconds to Mars concert chronology
- Into the Wild Tour (2010–11); Love, Lust, Faith and Dreams Tour (2013–15); Carnivores Tour (2014)

The Love, Lust, Faith and Dreams Tour was the third worldwide concert tour by American rock band Thirty Seconds to Mars in support of the band's fourth studio album Love, Lust, Faith and Dreams.

== Background ==
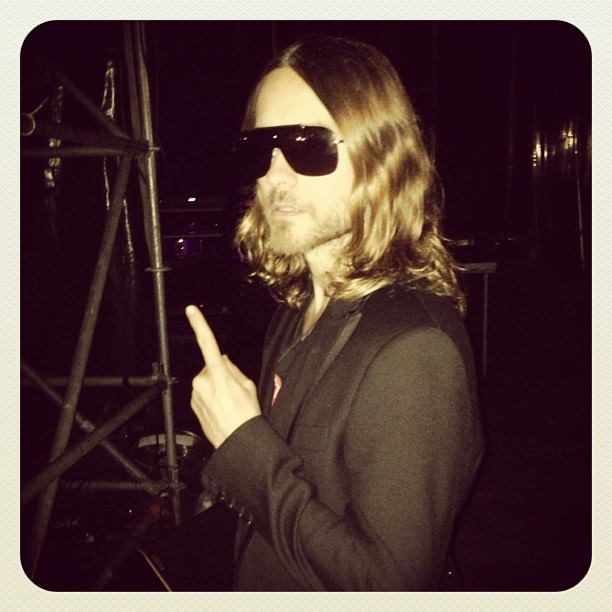
Jared Leto in Sopron, Volt Festival July 3, 2013

The tour started on June 5, 2013 in Europe (Impact Festival, Warsaw, Poland), playing in open-air spaces and festivals such as Rock am Ring, Rock Werchter, Download Festival, Nova Rock Festival, and Pinkpop Festival. In mid-August 2013, the tour should have reached Australia, but due to a medical procedure the dates were rescheduled to March 2014. Also in August they played in Tokyo. In September the band performed at Rock in Rio and the iTunes Festival. In the middle of September they will continue touring in North America. By the end of October the band will return to Europe to play in arenas. The venue in Melbourne, Australia is shifted to Hisense Arena to please Rolling Stones. Thirty Seconds to Mars later embarked on a double-headline tour, dubbed the Carnivores Tour, with American rock band Linkin Park, which spanned 25 dates in August and September 2014 in North America.

== Opening acts ==
- New Politics (USA)
- You Me at Six (Europe)
- Twin Atlantic (Europe)
- White Lies (Australia)

== Set list ==
1. "Birth"
2. "Night of the Hunter"
3. "Search and Destroy"
4. "This Is War"
5. "Conquistador"
6. "Kings and Queens"
7. "Do or Die"
8. "City of Angels"
9. "End of All Days"
10. "Savior"
11. "Hurricane"
12. "Attack"
13. "From Yesterday"
14. "The Kill (Bury Me)"
15. "Closer to the Edge"
16. "Bright Lights"
17. "Up in the Air"

== Tour dates ==
Date	City	Country	Venue
Leg 1: Europe
June 5, 2013	Warsaw	Poland	Impact Festival
June 6, 2013	Berlin	Germany	Zitadelle
June 7, 2013	Nürburg	Germany	Rock am Ring
June 9, 2013	Nuremberg	Germany	Rock im Park
June 12, 2013	Moscow	Russia	Maxidrom
June 14, 2013	Nickelsdorf	Austria	Nova Rock Festival
June 15, 2013	Landgraaf	Netherlands	Pinkpop Festival
June 16, 2013	Donington Park	England	Download Festival
June 19, 2013	Stockholm	Sweden	Gröna Lund
June 21, 2013	Copenhagen	Denmark	Tivoli Gardens
June 23, 2013	Oslo	Norway	Sentrum Scene
June 28, 2013	Helsinki	Finland	Rock the Beach Festival
July 2, 2013	Hradec Králové	Czech Republic	Rock for People
July 3, 2013	Sopron	Hungary	Volt Festival
July 5, 2013	Arras	France	Main Square Festival
July 7, 2013	Leuven	Belgium	Rock Werchter
July 9, 2013	Paris	France	Grand Palais
July 10, 2013	Colmar	France	Colmar Open Air Theatre
July 12, 2013	Aix-les-Bains	France	Aix-les-Bains Musilac Festival
July 13, 2013	Lucca	Italy	Piazza Napoleone Open Air
July 14, 2013	Padua	Italy	Anfiteatro Camerini Open Air
July 16, 2013	Nice	France	Nice Crazy Week Festival
July 18, 2013	Six-Fours-les-Plages	France	Festival Voix Du Gaou
July 19, 2013	Bayonne	France	Bayonne Arena Festival
July 20, 2013	Porto	Portugal	Mares Vivas Festival
Asia
August 21, 2013	Tokyo	Japan	Liquid Room
Festivals
September 14, 2013	Rio de Janeiro	Brazil	Rock in Rio
September 18, 2013	London	England	iTunes Festival
Leg 2: North America
September 20, 2013	San Diego	United States	91X Fest
September 21, 2013	Las Vegas	United States	iHeartRadio Music Festival
September 27, 2013	Atlanta	United States	The Tabernacle
September 28, 2013	Charlotte	United States	Verizon Wireless Amphitheatre
September 29, 2013	Camden	United States	Susquehanna Bank Center
October 1, 2013	Montréal	Canada	Evenko Metropolis
October 2, 2013	Montréal	Canada	Evenko Metropolis
October 3, 2013	Toronto	Canada	The Sound Academy
October 4, 2013	Columbus	United States	Lifestyle Communities Pavilion
October 5, 2013	Sterling Heights	United States	Freedom Hill Amphitheatre
October 8, 2013	Denver	United States	Fillmore Auditorium
October 9, 2013	Magna	United States	The Great Salt Air
October 11, 2013	San Jose	United States	Event Center Arena
October 12, 2013	Los Angeles	United States	Hollywood Bowl
Leg 3: Europe
October 29, 2013	Lisbon	Portugal	MEO Arena
October 30, 2013	Madrid	Spain	Palacio Vistalegre
October 31, 2013	Barcelona	Spain	Palau Municipal d'Esports de Badalona
November 2, 2013	Milan	Italy	Mediolanum Forum
November 3, 2013	Cologne	Germany	Lanxess Arena
November 5, 2013	Zürich	Switzerland	Hallenstadion
November 6, 2013	Munich	Germany	Olympiahalle
November 7, 2013	Frankfurt	Germany	Festhalle
November 8, 2013	Hamburg	Germany	O2 World
November 11, 2013	Antwerp	Belgium	Lotto Arena
November 12, 2013	Amsterdam	Netherlands	Ziggo Dome
November 14, 2013	Cardiff	Wales	Motorpoint Arena
November 15, 2013	Birmingham	England	National Indoor Arena
November 18, 2013	Newcastle upon Tyne	England	Metro Radio Arena
November 19, 2013	Glasgow	Scotland	The Hydro
November 21, 2013	Nottingham	England	Capital FM Arena
November 22, 2013	Plymouth	England	Plymouth Pavilions
November 23, 2013	London	England	O2 Arena
November 24, 2013	Manchester	England	Manchester Arena
November 25, 2013	Dublin	Ireland	O2 Arena
November 26, 2013	Belfast	Northern Ireland	Belfast Odyssey
Leg 4: North America
November 29, 2013	Tucson	United States	Rialto Theatre
November 30, 2013	Las Vegas	United States	The Joint
December 5, 2013	Grand Prairie	United States	Verizon Theatre at Grand Prairie
December 7, 2013	St. Petersburg	United States	97X Next Big Thing
December 8, 2013	Jacksonville	United States	X102.9′s The Big Ticket at Metropolitan Park
December 10, 2013	Nashville	United States	War Memorial Auditorium
December 12, 2013	St. Louis	United States	The Pageant
December 14, 2013	Cincinnati	United States	Bogart's
December 15, 2013	Indianapolis	United States	Egyptian Room
December 18, 2013	Richmond	United States	XL102′s Miracle on Broad Street at The National
December 19, 2013	Norfolk	United States	Norva Theatre
December 21, 2013	Tulsa	United States	Z104.5 The Edge's Christmas Concert
Leg 5: North America
January 21, 2014	Guadalajara	Mexico	Auditorio Telmex
January 22, 2014	Monterrey	Mexico	Auditorio Banamex
January 24, 2014	Mexico City	Mexico	Palacio de los Deportes
Leg 6: Europe
February 14, 2014	Lyon	France	Halle Tony Garnier
February 15, 2014	Lille	France	Zénith de Lille
February 17, 2014	Paris	France	Zénith de Paris
February 18, 2014	Paris	France	Zénith de Paris
February 19, 2014	Stuttgart	Germany	Schleyerhalle
February 21, 2014	Copenhagen	Denmark	Falkoner
February 22, 2014	Stockholm	Sweden	Stora Arenan
February 23, 2014	Oslo	Norway	Oslo Spektrum
February 25, 2014	Berlin	Germany	O2 World
February 26, 2014	Hanover	Germany	TUI Arena
March 8, 2014	Helsinki	Finland	Hartwall Arena
March 10, 2014	Minsk	Belarus	Minsk-Arena
March 12, 2014	Kyiv	Ukraine	Palace of Sports
March 14, 2014	Krasnodar	Russia	Sports Palace Olimp
March 15, 2014	Rostov-on-Don	Russia	Sports Palace
March 16, 2014	Moscow	Russia	Olympic Stadium
March 18, 2014	Saint Petersburg	Russia	Saint Petersburg Sports and Concert Complex
Leg 7: Australia
March 25, 2014	Perth	Australia	Challenge Stadium
March 28, 2014	Melbourne	Australia	Hisense Arena
March 29, 2014	Sydney	Australia	Qantas Credit Union Arena
March 30, 2014	Brisbane	Australia	Riverstage
Leg 8: Asia
April 2, 2014	Osaka	Japan	Big Cat
April 3, 2014	Tokyo	Japan	Shibuya-Ax
April 5, 2014	Bangkok	Thailand	Bitec Bangna
Leg 9: Europe
June 19, 2014	Turin	Italy	Palasport Olimpico
June 20, 2014	Rome	Italy	Rock in Roma
June 22, 2014	Rybnik	Poland	Rybnik Stadium
June 25, 2014	Mönchengladbach	Germany	Warsteiner HockeyPark
June 27, 2014	Roeser	Luxembourg	Rock A Field
June 28, 2014	Piešťany	Slovakia	Topfest
June 30, 2014	Prague	Czech Republic	Tipsport Arena
July 1, 2014	Vienna	Austria	Rinderhalle
July 2, 2014	Linz	Austria	Linz Castle
July 3, 2014	Sopron	Hungary	Volt Festival
July 5, 2014	Bucharest	Romania	Romexpo
July 6, 2014	Sofia	Bulgaria	Sofia Rocks Festival
July 9, 2014	Yaroslavl	Russia	Arena 2000
July 11, 2014	Kazan	Russia	TatNeft Arena
July 13, 2014	Yekaterinburg	Russia	KRK Uralets
July 15, 2014	Tallinn	Estonia	Saku Suurhall Arena
July 17, 2014	Vienne	France	Theatre Antique
July 18, 2014	Cannes	France	Palais des Festivals Terrace
July 20, 2014	Carhaix	France	Vieilles Charrues Festival
July 22, 2014	Nyon	Switzerland	Paléo Festival
July 24, 2014	Saint-Tropez	France	Citadelle
July 25, 2014	Corsica	France	Patrimonio Le Nuits de La Guitare
Leg 10
September 20, 2014	Las Vegas	United States	The Cosmopolitan
Leg 11: Latin America
October 3, 2014	San Juan	Puerto Rico	Coliseo de Puerto Rico José Miguel Agrelot
October 5, 2014	San José	Costa Rica	Palacio de los Deportes (Heredia)
October 7, 2014	Quito	Ecuador	Agora de la Casa de la Cultura
October 9, 2014	Lima	Peru	Parque de la Exposicion
October 11, 2014	Buenos Aires	Argentina	Luna Park
October 12, 2014	Buenos Aires	Argentina	La Rural
October 14, 2014	Santiago	Chile	Movistar Arena
October 16, 2014	São Paulo	Brazil	Espaço das Americas
October 18, 2014	Rio de Janeiro	Brazil	Fundição Progresso
October 19, 2014	Rio de Janeiro	Brazil	Fundição Progresso
October 21, 2014	Brasília	Brazil	Opera Hall
October 24, 2014	Asunción	Paraguay	Yacht & Golf Club Paraguayo
October 26, 2014	Panama City	Panama	Pixbae Rock Fest- Plaza Figali
Leg 12: South Africa
November 21, 2014	Johannesburg	South Africa	Coca-Cola Dome
November 23, 2014	Cape Town	South Africa	Grandwest Arena
Leg 13: Europe
March 8, 2015	Sochi	Russia	Shayba Arena
March 10, 2015	Voronezh	Russia	Voronezh Sports Palace
March 13, 2015	Volgograd	Russia	Sports Palace
March 15, 2015	Tolyatti	Russia	Volgar’ Sports Palace
March 18, 2015	Saint Petersburg	Russia	Saint Petersburg Sports and Concert Complex
March 22, 2015	Moscow	Russia	Olympic Stadium
March 23, 2015	Ufa	Russia	Sports Palace
March 24, 2015	Chelyabinsk	Russia	Arena Unost
March 26, 2015	Perm	Russia	Sports Palace
March 28, 2015	Omsk	Russia	Sport Palace Blinova
March 29, 2015	Novosibirsk	Russia	LDS Sibir
March 31, 2015	Krasnoyarsk	Russia	Sport Palace Yarygina
April 2, 2015	Nizhny Novgorod	Russia	Novgorod Expo Yarmarka
April 4, 2015	Minsk	Belarus	Chizhovka Arena
May 2, 2015	Ischgl	Austria	Silvretta Arena
May 4, 2015	Sopot	Poland	Ergo Arena
May 6, 2015	Kyiv	Ukraine	Kyiv Sports Palace
May 8, 2015	Paris	France	Le Bataclan
May 9, 2015	London	England	Church of St John-at-Hackney
Asia
September 25, 2015	Dubai	United Arab Emirates	Dubai World Trade Centre Arena
Europe
September 27, 2015	Getafe	Spain	Neox Rocks Festival
September 30, 2015	Athens	Greece	Terra Vibe Park
