= Thirty Seconds to Mars discography =

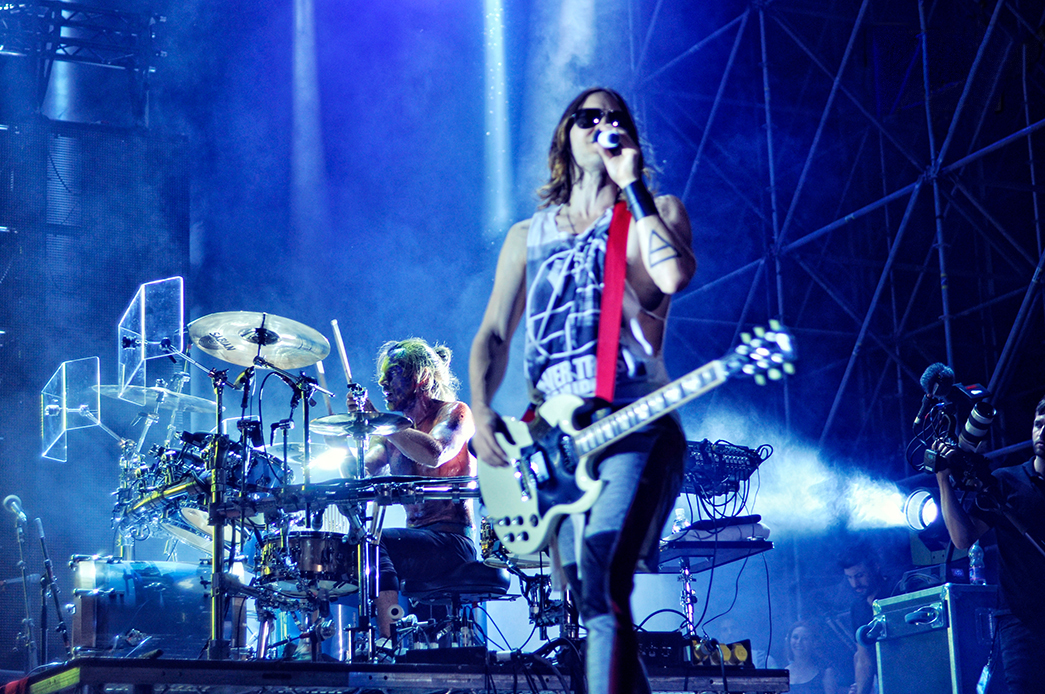
- Frontman Jared Leto and drummer Shannon Leto performing in July 2013
- Studio albums: 6
- Extended plays: 3
- Singles: 19
- Video albums: 1
- Music videos: 18
- Promotional singles: 5

American rock band Thirty Seconds to Mars has released six studio albums, three extended plays, nineteen singles, five promotional singles, one video album and eighteen music videos. The band was formed in Los Angeles, California, in 1998 by brothers Jared Leto and Shannon Leto, with Tomo Miličević joining the band later. The band's debut album, 30 Seconds to Mars, was released through Immortal and Virgin Records in August 2002 and peaked at number 107 on the US Billboard 200 and number one on the US Top Heatseekers, selling more than two million copies worldwide as of March 2011. The album produced two singles, "Capricorn (A Brand New Name)" and "Edge of the Earth".

The band released their second album, A Beautiful Lie, in August 2005. It peaked at number 38 on the US Billboard 200 and received multiple certifications all over the world, including platinum in the United States. The first single from the album, "Attack", was the most added track on American alternative radio during its first week of release, while "The Kill", the second single, set a record for the longest-running hit in the history of the US Alternative Songs chart when it remained on the national chart for more than 50 weeks, following its number three peak in 2006. The third single, "From Yesterday", topped the US Alternative Songs for several weeks. "A Beautiful Lie" was released as the album's fourth single in some territories.

In 2008, the band attempted to sign with a new label, prompting EMI to file a $30 million lawsuit, claiming that Thirty Seconds to Mars was obligated to produce three more albums as required by its contract. The case settled as the band returned to EMI, and This Is War, the third album, arrived in December 2009. The album peaked at number 18 in the United States and reached the top ten of several national album charts, including Austria, New Zealand and Portugal. Its first two singles, "Kings and Queens" and "This Is War", reached the number-one spot on the US Alternative Songs chart. The third single, "Closer to the Edge", topped the UK Rock Chart for eight consecutive weeks. The band collaborated with rapper Kanye West on the single "Hurricane 2.0", which was released as the album's fourth single in selected territories and reached number four on the UK Rock Chart. Their fourth studio album, Love, Lust, Faith and Dreams, was released through Universal in May 2013 and reached the top ten in more than fifteen countries, including the United Kingdom and the United States. Its singles "Up in the Air", "Do or Die", and "City of Angels" reached the top twenty in Portugal and on the US Alternative Songs chart. The band released their fifth studio album, America, in April 2018, preceded by the single "Walk on Water".

== Studio albums ==
List of studio albums, with selected chart positions, sales figures and certifications
Title	Album details	Peak chart positions										Sales	Certifications
Title	Album details	US	AUS	AUT	FIN	GER	ITA	POL	PRT	SWI	UK	Sales	Certifications
30 Seconds to Mars	Released: August 27, 2002 (US); Label: Immortal, Virgin; Formats: CD, LP, cassette, digital download	107	89	—	—	—	—	—	—	—	—	WW: 2,000,000 (Note: Worldwide sales figures for 30 Seconds to Mars as of March 2011.); US: 121,000 (Note: United States sales figures for 30 Seconds to Mars as of August 2006.)	BPI: Silver
A Beautiful Lie	Released: August 30, 2005 (US); Label: Virgin; Formats: CD, CD+DVD, LP, digital download	36	20	10	15	14	11	51	23	49	38	WW: 4,000,000 (Note: Worldwide sales figures for A Beautiful Lie as of February 2012.); US: 1,200,000 (Note: United States sales figures for A Beautiful Lie as of December 2009.); UK: 300,000 (Note: United Kingdom sales figures for A Beautiful Lie as of February 2012.)	RIAA: Platinum; ARIA: Gold; BPI: Platinum; BVMI: Platinum; FIMI: Platinum; MC: Gold; RMNZ: Platinum
This Is War	Released: December 8, 2009 (US); Label: Virgin; Formats: CD, CD+DVD, LP, digital download	18	18	8	19	12	29	34	6	20	15	WW: 4,000,000 (Note: Worldwide sales figures for This Is War as of May 2013.); US: 500,000 (Note: United States sales figures for This Is War as of March 2013.); UK: 380,300 (Note: United Kingdom sales figures for This Is War as of April 2018.)	RIAA: Gold; AFP: 2× Platinum; ARIA: Gold; BPI: Platinum; BVMI: Platinum; FIMI: Gold; IFPI AUT: Gold; ZPAV: Platinum; RMNZ: Gold
Love, Lust, Faith and Dreams	Released: May 21, 2013 (US); Label: Virgin; Formats: CD, CD+DVD, LP, digital download	6	4	3	6	3	3	5	1	5	5	US: 394,000 (Note: United States sales figures for Love, Lust, Faith and Dreams as of July 2016.)	AFP: 2× Platinum; BPI: Gold; BVMI: Gold; FIMI: Gold; IFPI AUT: Gold; ZPAV: Gold
America	Released: April 6, 2018 (US); Label: Interscope; Formats: CD, LP, cassette, digital download	2	10	1	13	1	2	4	2	2	4		
It's the End of the World but It's a Beautiful Day	Released: September 15, 2023; Label: Concord; Formats: CD, LP, cassette, digital download	76	9	17	51	16	12	16	25	7	20		
"—" denotes items which were not released in that country or failed to chart.

== Extended plays ==
List of extended plays, with selected chart positions and certifications
Title	EP details	Peak chart positions									Certifications
Title	EP details	US	US Alt.	US Rock	AUT	ITA	NOR	PRT	UK	UK Rock	Certifications
AOL Sessions Undercover	Released: March 13, 2007 (US); Label: Virgin; Formats: Digital download	—	—	—	—	—	—	—	—	—	
To the Edge of the Earth	Released: March 25, 2008 (US); Label: Virgin; Formats: CD+DVD	—	—	—	—	—	—	—	—	—	
MTV Unplugged	Released: August 19, 2011 (US); Label: Virgin; Formats: Digital download	76	12	16	38	34	38	9	133	3	AFP: Gold
"—" denotes items which were not released in that country or failed to chart.

== Singles ==
List of singles, with selected chart positions and certifications, showing year released and album name
Title	Year	Peak chart positions										Certifications	Album
Title	Year	US	US Alt.	US Rock	AUS	AUT	GER	NLD	NZ	PRT	UK	Certifications	Album
"Capricorn (A Brand New Name)"	2002	—	—	31	—	—	—	—	—	—	—		30 Seconds to Mars
"Edge of the Earth"	2003	—	—	—	—	—	—	—	—	—	—		30 Seconds to Mars
"Attack"	2005	—	22	38	—	—	—	—	—	—	148		A Beautiful Lie
"The Kill"	2006	65	3	14	20	39	36	51	22	16	28	RIAA: 2× Platinum; BPI: Platinum; BVMI: Gold; RMNZ: Platinum	A Beautiful Lie
"From Yesterday"	2006	76	1	11	33	53	72	50	13	17	37	BPI: Silver; RMNZ: Gold	A Beautiful Lie
"A Beautiful Lie"	2007	—	37	—	—	—	92	—	—	11	—		A Beautiful Lie
"Kings and Queens"	2009	82	1	4	67	35	39	21	14	9	28	BPI: Gold; RMNZ: Platinum	This Is War
"This Is War"	2010	72	1	4	—	73	79	52	—	—	51	RIAA: Gold; BPI: Silver; RMNZ: Gold	This Is War
"Closer to the Edge"	2010	99	7	21	13	20	26	44	21	6	44	AFP: Platinum; ARIA: Platinum; BPI: Silver; BVMI: Gold; RMNZ: Gold	This Is War
"Hurricane" (featuring Kanye West)	2010	—	—	—	67	—	45	—	—	27	193		This Is War
"Up in the Air"	2013	— (Note: "Up in the Air" did not enter the US Billboard Hot 100, but peaked at number 7 on the Bubbling Under Hot 100 Singles chart.)	3	16	68	45	47	49	—	12	45	AFP: Gold	Love, Lust, Faith and Dreams
"Do or Die"	2013	—	20	38	—	75	—	42	—	16	—		Love, Lust, Faith and Dreams
"City of Angels"	2013	—	8	31	93	—	92	—	—	17	—	AFP: Gold	Love, Lust, Faith and Dreams
"Walk on Water"	2017	— (Note: "Walk on Water" did not enter the US Billboard Hot 100, but peaked at number 6 on the Bubbling Under Hot 100 Singles chart.)	2	5	99	38	84	50	—	39	87	RIAA: Gold; BVMI: Gold; MC: Gold	America
"Dangerous Night"	2018	— (Note: "Dangerous Night" did not enter the US Billboard Hot 100, but peaked at number 36 on the Digital Song Sales chart.)	2	8	—	53	78	—	— (Note: "Dangerous Night" did not enter the NZ Top 40 Singles Chart, but peaked at number 10 on the NZ Heatseeker Singles Chart.)	36	— (Note: "Dangerous Night" did not enter the UK Singles Chart, but peaked at number 57 on the UK Singles Sales Chart.)		America
"Rescue Me"	2018	—	18	31	—	—	—	—	—	—	—		America
"Stuck"	2023	—	2	30	—	—	—	63	—	—	— (Note: "Stuck" did not enter the UK Singles Chart, but peaked at number 70 on the UK Singles Sales Chart.)		It's the End of the World but It's a Beautiful Day
"Seasons"	2023	—	23	33	—	— (Note: "Seasons" did not enter the Ö3 Austria Top 40, but peaked at number 15 on the Austrian airplay chart.)	— (Note: "Seasons" did not enter the German Singles Chart, but peaked at number 2 on the German airplay chart.)	—	—	—	—		It's the End of the World but It's a Beautiful Day
"World on Fire"	2024	—	—	—	—	—	— (Note: "World on Fire" did not enter the German Singles Chart, but peaked at number 66 on the German airplay chart.)	—	—	—	—		It's the End of the World but It's a Beautiful Day
"—" denotes items which were not released in that country or failed to chart.

=== Promotional singles ===
List of promotional singles, with selected chart positions, showing year released and album name
Title	Year	Peak chart positions					Album
Title	Year	US Alt.	US Rock	FRA	ITA	POL	Album
"The Kill" (acoustic, live on VH1)	2006	35	—	—	—	—	Non-album single
"Search and Destroy"	2010	—	—	—	—	45	This Is War
"Night of the Hunter"	2011	—	50	—	—	—	This Is War
"Stay"	2014	—	— (Note: "Stay" did not enter the Rock Songs chart, but peaked at number 41 on the Rock Digital Songs chart.)	121	—	—	Non-album single
"Avalanche"	2024	—	—	—	22	—	It's the End of the World but It's a Beautiful Day
"—" denotes items which were not released in that country or failed to chart.

== Other charted songs ==
List of songs, with selected chart positions, showing year charted and album name
Title	Year	Peak chart positions				Album
Title	Year	US Rock	AUT	PRT	UK Rock	Album
"Hurricane"	2010	—	—	—	39	This Is War (2010 deluxe edition)
"Bad Romance"	2010	—	—	—	11	This Is War (2010 deluxe edition)
"Stronger"	2010	—	—	—	34	This Is War (2010 deluxe edition)
"Kings and Queens"	2011	—	38	—	—	MTV Unplugged
"Where the Streets Have No Name"	2011	—	—	10	—	MTV Unplugged
"Conquistador"	2013	—	—	—	24	Love, Lust, Faith and Dreams
"One Track Mind" (featuring A$AP Rocky)	2018	35	—	—	—	America
"Love Is Madness" (featuring Halsey)	2018	9	—	—	—	America
"—" denotes items which were not released in that country or failed to chart.

== Other appearances ==
List of guest appearances, showing year released and album name
Title	Year	Album
"Santa Through the Back Door"	2006	Kevin & Bean's Super Christmas
"Stronger"	2007	Radio 1's Live Lounge – Volume 2
"The Only One" (Remix 4 by 30 Seconds to Mars)	2008	Hypnagogic States
"Stay"	2013	BBC Radio 1's Live Lounge 2013
"Do or Die" (Afrojack vs. Thirty Seconds to Mars Remix)	2014	Forget the World
"Wouldn't Change a Thing" (Illenium feat. Thirty Seconds to Mars)	2021	Fallen Embers

== Video albums ==
List of video albums
Title	Album details
Bartholomew Cubbins 2006–2014	Released: April 13, 2015 (US); Label: Sisyphus; Formats: DVD+Blu-ray

== Music videos ==
List of music videos, showing year released and director
Title	Year	Director(s)
"Capricorn (A Brand New Name)"	2002	Paul Fedor
"Edge of the Earth"	2003	Kevin McCullough
"Attack"	2005	Paul Fedor
"The Kill"	2006	Bartholomew Cubbins
"From Yesterday"	2006	Bartholomew Cubbins
"A Beautiful Lie"	2008	Angakok Panipaq
"Kings and Queens"	2009	Bartholomew Cubbins
"Closer to the Edge"	2010	Bartholomew Cubbins
"Hurricane"	2010	Bartholomew Cubbins
"This Is War"	2011	Édouard Salier
"Up in the Air"	2013	Bartholomew Cubbins
"Do or Die"	2013	Bartholomew Cubbins
"City of Angels"	2013	Jared Leto
"Walk on Water"	2017	Jared Leto
"Rescue Me"	2018	Mark Romanek
"Hail to the Victor"	2021	Jared Leto
"Stuck"	2023	Jared Leto
"Avalanche"	2025	Fredrik Jonsson
