= Bartholomew Cubbins 2006–2014 =

Video by Thirty Seconds to Mars
- Released: April 13, 2015
- Recorded: 2006–2014
- Genre: Alternative rock
- Length: 152 minutes
- Label: Sisyphus
- Director: Jared Leto (as Bartholomew Cubbins)

Bartholomew Cubbins 2006–2014 is a collection of music videos by American rock band Thirty Seconds to Mars, released in the United States on April 13, 2015 by Sisyphus. It features all of the music videos directed for the band by frontman Jared Leto from 2006 to 2014 in addition to behind-the-scenes footage, covering the period from A Beautiful Lie (2005), This Is War (2009) and Love, Lust, Faith and Dreams (2013).

The album is named after Leto's directorial pseudonym Bartholomew Cubbins, based on the character of the same name created by Dr. Seuss.

== Overview ==
=== 2000s ===
In 2006, lead vocalist Jared Leto began to direct music videos for Thirty Seconds to Mars, with the first being "The Kill". At a press release, he stated that an "insanely obnoxious Danish albino" named Bartholomew Cubbins directed the video. He later explained his decision to direct with a pseudonym saying, "I really wanted people to be able to enjoy and experience the video without having any more preconceived notions or distractions, and just to let it be what it was. It wasn't important for me to lay claim to it in that way." Bartholomew Cubbins is a recurring character in the Dr. Seuss universe and one of Leto's favorite characters created by the writer. The short film received a largely positive response and numerous accolades, including an MTV Video Music Award. The same year, Leto directed the short film for "From Yesterday". Filmed in the Forbidden City, it became the first ever American music video shot in the People's Republic of China in its entirety.

His next short film was "A Beautiful Lie" (2008). Although he directed it under the pseudonym of Angakok Panipaq, his alter ego Bartholomew Cubbins received a "special thanks" credit. The music video was filmed 200 miles north of the Arctic Circle in Greenland, with Leto working with the Natural Resources Defense Council to develop strategies that would minimize fuel consumption on the shoot. Upon release, "A Beautiful Lie" was met with widespread critical acclaim, resulting in various accolades, including the MTV Europe Music Award for Best Video. Proceeds from the video's sales benefited the Natural Resources Defense Council. The following year, Leto directed the short film for "Kings and Queens" (2009), which features a critical mass movement founded with forward-thinking and eco-conscious intentions, through Los Angeles at night. At the 2010 MTV Video Music Awards, it received four nominations, including Video of the Year and Best Direction, and went on to win Best Rock Video.

=== 2010s ===
Leto then filmed "Closer to the Edge" (2010), a short film featuring tour footage, fan commentary and pictures of Thirty Seconds to Mars from their youth, during the band's Into the Wild Tour. His next project was "Hurricane" (2010), an experimental short film which explores personal demons and unlocking secret fantasies in what is believed to be a dream. Upon release, "Hurricane" garnered controversy and was initially censored due to its elements of violence. At the 2011 MTV Video Music Awards, the short film received three nominations in the categories of Best Direction, Best Cinematography and Best Editing.

Leto filmed the 2013 short film for "Up in the Air" at a now-defunct aerospace manufacturing building in Los Angeles, with appearances from several artists, including burlesque dancer Dita Von Teese, gymnasts McKayla Maroney and Jordyn Wieber, writer Neil Strauss and a number of animals. It garnered several awards, including the MTV Video Music Award for Best Rock Video, and competed at the 2013 Camerimage. He described the concept of his next short film, "Do or Die" (2013), as a companion piece to "Closer to the Edge" (2010). It was filmed during the Love, Lust, Faith and Dreams Tour and features live footage as well as fan commentary. The same year, Leto directed the critically praised short film for "City of Angels". Although it is billed as a "Bartholomew Cubbins Film", "City of Angels" is the first directorial project directly credited to Leto. He explained, "It was the first time I'd ever done that. I'd used several different names, but it was just such a personal thing. I thought it was appropriate to put my name on that piece." The music video features a number of personalities who join the three members of Thirty Seconds to Mars in sharing their visions about Los Angeles.

== Release ==
A collection of music videos by Thirty Seconds to Mars was officially announced in early April 2015 through the band's official website. Named Bartholomew Cubbins 2006–2014 from Jared Leto's longtime directorial pseudonym, the video includes all short films directed by Leto from 2006 to 2014. It also features exclusive behind the scenes footage for the music videos of "The Kill", "From Yesterday", "Kings and Queens" and "Hurricane". In early 2015, entertainment ticketing company Adventures In Wonderland held special screenings of the collection at select locations around the world. Bartholomew Cubbins 2006–2014 was announced shortly before completing the Love, Lust, Faith and Dreams Tour. It was made available for pre-order on April 7, 2015, exclusively through the band's official store. The video was released on DVD and Blu-ray formats on April 13, by Sisyphus Corporation, a company through which Jared Leto produced most of the band's music videos with producing partner Emma Ludbrook.

== Track listing ==
No.	Title	Producer(s)	Length
1.	"The Kill"	Douglas Friedman; Alexander Moon	5:46
2.	"From Yesterday"	Jordon Winter	13:30
3.	"A Beautiful Lie"	Edy Enriquez; Yamani Watkins	7:15
4.	"Kings and Queens"	Jared Leto; Emma Ludbrook; Sheira Rees-Davies; Melissa Larsen; Dave Robertson	8:50
5.	"Closer to the Edge"	Leto; Ludbrook	6:22
6.	"Hurricane"	Anke Thommen	13:12
7.	"Up in the Air"	Leto; Ludbrook	8:31
8.	"Do or Die"	Leto; Ludbrook	7:03
9.	"City of Angels"	Leto; Ludbrook; Allan Wachs	11:33
10.	"The Kill" (Behind-the-scenes)
11.	"From Yesterday" (Behind-the-scenes)
12.	"Kings and Queens" (Behind-the-scenes)
13.	"Hurricane" (Behind-the-scenes)
