= MTV Unplugged (Thirty Seconds to Mars EP) =

2011 EP by Thirty Seconds to Mars

EP and Live album by Thirty Seconds to Mars
- Released: August 19, 2011
- Recorded: May 13, 2011
- Venue: Sony Music Studios, New York City
- Genre: Acoustic rock
- Length: 20:41 (EP); 30:03 (Video)
- Label: Virgin; Capitol

Thirty Seconds to Mars chronology
This Is War (2009)	MTV Unplugged (2011)	Love, Lust, Faith and Dreams (2013)

MTV Unplugged is an extended play (EP) and live album by American rock band Thirty Seconds to Mars, released in the United States on August 19, 2011, by Virgin Records. It features an acoustic performance taped at Sony Music Studios in New York City on May 13 of that year for the television series MTV Unplugged. The show's purpose is to present name artists, and feature them stripped of studio equipment. The performance was accompanied by musicians from the Vitamin String Quartet, a gospel choir and included the contribution of the band's fans.

The extended play includes rearranged versions of three songs extracted from Thirty Seconds to Mars' third studio album, This Is War (2009), and a cover version of a song by U2. Upon release, MTV Unplugged received universal acclaim from music critics, many of whom complimented the band's musicianship and the album's production. Commercially, it debuted at number 76 on the Billboard 200 and experienced moderate success in some international markets.

== Recording ==
Thirty Seconds to Mars recorded their performance on May 13, 2011, at Sony Music Studios in New York City. The show featured a number of musicians from the Vitamin String Quartet and back-up vocalists from The Late Show's Gospel Choir. It marked the first live performance by the former. The show was produced by Jay Peterson and Leah Culton-Gonzales through the production company Original Media, with additional contributions by Jeff Baumgardner and Lee Rolontz. Thirty Seconds to Mars dedicated several days to rehearsals, in which they reworked and experimented with their musical repertoire.

The band invited their fans to attend rehearsal sessions to work on songs that needed background vocals. Jared Leto expressed his gratitude to the band's fans, termed as the Echelon, emphasizing their strong collaboration. During rehearsals, musicians from the Vitamin String Quartet were also involved, with Leto stating that they were "really open and collaborative, [...] fluid and in the moment and improvisational." Thirty Seconds to Mars explained the scrupulous process of deciding which songs to cover, considering tracks by artists as varied as Cyndi Lauper, Gheorghe Zamfir, Eminem, and Fleetwood Mac. The band stated that they also considered a song by Dolly Parton, before they decided on "Where the Streets Have No Name" by U2, which is reputed a special song for Jared and Shannon Leto.

The show began with "Hurricane", followed by "Alibi", "Kings and Queens", "Closer to the Edge", "Night of the Hunter", "Where the Streets Have No Name", and "Message in a Bottle", originally by The Police. Short instrumental versions of songs by The Cure, Pantera and Slayer were also played by Tomo Miličević, Shannon Leto and Tim Kelleher. The Vitamin String Quartet musicians who took part in the recording included two violinists, a violist, a cellist and a conductor. The performance of "Where the Streets Have No Name" featured The Late Show's Gospel Choir, consisting of five men and five women dressed in red. After filming, Jared Leto described the band's excitement about being asked to record for MTV Unplugged stating, "I think our generation, it was kind of a rite of passage, and if you were invited to do MTV Unplugged, it certainly was a pretty big deal. So many of our favorite bands did 'Unplugged' and still do it, so we were really thrilled to be asked."

== Release ==
The MTV Unplugged episode featuring Thirty Seconds to Mars premiered on MTV on July 19, 2011. The televised performance was shortened to five tracks, excluding "Alibi" and "Message in a Bottle". The episode debuted on MTV.com as part of a live viewing event where fans had the opportunity to interact with others through instant messaging while watching the show. Beginning on July 21, "Hurricane" went into music video rotations through MTV's main channels. A thirty-minute special debuted on the high-definition music channel Palladia on July 29, with an encore at midnight.

The concert's success prompted Virgin Records to release it as a four-track extended play on August 19, 2011, in digital format. The label also planned to release a video accompaniment package in time for the Christmas holidays. However, the deadline for the release was missed after some technical issues and Thirty Seconds to Mars decided to release it for download on VyRT in December 2011. Aside from featuring the four tracks which appear on the extended play, it includes the performance of "Alibi" and some exclusive footage of the recording. Virgin later released the video to digital retailers on March 2, 2012.

== Critical reception ==
Professional ratings
Review scores
Source	Rating
Alternative Addiction	4/5 stars
AltSounds	9.6/10
Chemical	5/5 stars
Loudwire	4/5 stars
Entertainment Weekly	favorable

Upon its release, MTV Unplugged received universal acclaim from music critics. Ryan Jones from Alternative Addiction gave the album four stars out of five, writing that "the final product has been touched up perfectly and the four songs on the EP are the perfect selections." He described both "Where the Streets Have No Name" and "Kings and Queens" as "chilling", but concluded his review saying that "it would have been nice to get a few more songs." Joanna Bomberg from MTV commented that "Thirty Seconds to Mars have delivered a truly visual and sonically compelling performance that will inspire their fans and captivate new ones." Kyle Anderson of Entertainment Weekly praised the show and felt that the band's cover of "Where the Streets Have No Name" was "stellar." Alex Easton of AltSounds called the show "emotional, powerful and stunning." He praised Leto's vocals and wrote that the album "not only brings a different element to some classic songs, but cements Thirty Seconds to Mars' place as one of the finest acts of this generation."

Amy Sciarretto from Loudwire praised the band's musicianship and wrote, "While U2 songs are often sacred ground, Thirty Seconds to Mars handle their rendition of 'Where the Streets Have No Name' perfectly." Kayleigh Burn, writing for Chemical magazine, awarded the album five stars out of a possible five and felt that the band "conquer[s] the listener with a barrage of stunning vocals, memorable guitars and the recurring hum of the violins." She opined that "Hurricane" was "the best representation of a steadfast performance" and commented that the album "lends the opportunity for a tranquil and calm display of their abilities and more importantly, their hearts." At the end of 2011, the Unplugged version of "Hurricane" won the MTV Award for Best Live Performance, with critic James Montgomery commenting that the band's performance "is very much a communal thing, one where a celebration never seems all that far off."

== Commercial performance ==
In the United States, MTV Unplugged debuted at number 76 on the Billboard 200 and number 15 on the Digital Albums on the issue dated September 10, 2011. It also entered the Alternative Albums at number 12 and the Rock Albums at number 16. On September 2, 2011, the album debuted at number 38 on the Ö3 Austria Top 40. In Italy, it reached number 35 on the Musica e dischi singles chart on the week ending September 2, 2011. In Norway, MTV Unplugged entered the VG-lista at number 38 during the week of August 30, 2011.

In Portugal, the album debuted at number ten, eventually peaking at number nine the following week. On the week dated October 8, 2011, the track "Where the Streets Have No Name" reached number ten on the national singles chart. After spending ten weeks on the chart, the album was certified gold by the Associação Fonográfica Portuguesa (AFP), denoting sales of over 10,000 units throughout the country. In the United Kingdom, the album debuted at number 133 on the UK Singles Chart, during the week dated September 3, 2011. It also entered the UK Rock Chart at number three.

== Track listing ==
All tracks are written by Jared Leto, except where noted.

No.	Title	Writer(s)	Length
1.	"Hurricane"		4:21
2.	"Kings and Queens"		6:14
3.	"Night of the Hunter"		5:37
4.	"Where the Streets Have No Name"	Paul Hewson; David Evans; Adam Clayton; Larry Mullen Jr.	4:29

== Personnel ==
- Thirty Seconds to Mars – primary artist, music production, arrangement
- Steven Alvarado – audio coordinator
- James "Jimbo" Barton – audio mixing
- Leah Culton-Gonzales – video production
- Shamello Durant – production coordinator
- The Late Show's Gospel Choir – background vocals
- Tim Kelleher – bass
- Jared Leto – vocals, guitar
- Shannon Leto – drums, percussion
- Mike Levine – editing
- Jason Marcucci – audio recording
- Tomo Miličević – guitar
- Braxton Olita - keyboards
- Jacqueline Munro – assistant director
- Jared Jenkins – production manager
- Mike Judeh – audio engineering
- Christian Palladino – line production
- Jay Peterson – video production
- Matt Podaski – stage manager
- Vitamin String Quartet – strings

Credits for MTV Unplugged adapted from the video album.

== Charts and certifications ==
=== Weekly charts ===
Chart (2011)	Peak position
Austrian Singles (Ö3 Austria Top 40)	38
Italian Singles (Musica e dischi)	35
Norwegian Albums (VG-lista)	38
Portuguese Singles (AFP)	9
UK Rock Singles (OCC)	3
UK Singles (OCC)	133
US Billboard 200	76
US Alternative Albums (Billboard)	12
US Rock Albums (Billboard)	16

=== Certifications ===
Region	Certification	Certified units/sales
Portugal (AFP)	Gold	10,000^{^}
^{^} Shipments figures based on certification alone.
