= Search and Destroy (Thirty Seconds to Mars song) =

Promotional single by Thirty Seconds to Mars

from the album This Is War
- Released: October 25, 2010
- Recorded: 2008–2009; The International Centre for the Advancement of the Arts and Sciences of Sound (Los Angeles, California)
- Genre: Rock
- Length: 5:38 (album version); 4:46 (radio edit)
- Label: Virgin, EMI
- Songwriter: Jared Leto
- Producers: Flood, 30 Seconds to Mars

"Search and Destroy" is a song recorded by American rock band Thirty Seconds to Mars, for their third studio album This Is War. It appears as the ninth track on the album. Written by lead vocalist Jared Leto, the song was released as a promotional single to UK radio on October 25, 2010. The track was produced by Flood and 30 Seconds to Mars, and was originally not going to be on the album because the song was so hard to mix.

== Background and recording ==
The song includes a heavy contribution from the band's fans, captured singing a chorus created from layers of the band's Summit recordings.

While doing an exclusive track by track album preview, Jared told MusicRadar:

Actually, we were going to throw this song out, but we decided to keep it. It was hard to mix, a total pain in ass, but I’m glad it made the record because I think it fits in with the overall framework of the album.

"The song is a mission, an adventure that takes you on a journey. Maybe that’s why it gave us so much trouble: We had [to] go on an adventure as a band to get it right. Some songs come very easily and other ones fight you.

"Oftentimes, the ones that give you trouble turn out to be the best ones - this is an example of the latter.

== Live performances ==
"Search and Destroy" was a regular on setlists during the Into the Wild and Closer to the Edge tours, after This Is War had been released. When played live, guitars and bass are tuned to Eb standard (low to high: Eb-Ab-Db-Gb-Bb-Eb).

== Track listing ==
All songs written by Jared Leto.

UK promotional single
No.	Title	Length
1.	"Search and Destroy"	5:39

European promotional single
No.	Title	Length
1.	"Search and Destroy"	4:46

== Personnel ==
Credits adapted from This Is War liner notes.

- Performed by 30 Seconds to Mars
- Written by Jared Leto
- Published by Apocraphex Music (ASCAP)/Universal Music - Z Tunes, LLC (ASCAP)
- Produced by Flood, Steve Lillywhite, 30 Seconds to Mars
- Recorded by Ryan Williams, Matt Radosevich at The International Centre for the Advancement of the Arts and Sciences of Sound, Los Angeles, CA
- Additional engineering by Tom Biller, Rob Kirwan, Jamie Schefman, Sonny Diperri
- Mixed by Ryan Williams at Pulse Recording Studios, Los Angeles, CA
- Additional strings orchestrated and recorded by Michael Einziger at Harvard University, Cambridge, MA
- Mastered by Stephen Marcussen at Marcussen Mastering, Hollywood, CA

== Charts ==
Chart (2009–10)	Peak position
Polish Singles Chart	77
Polish Rock Chart	8
UK Singles Chart	94

== Release history ==
Region	Date	Format	Label
United Kingdom	October 25, 2010	Contemporary hit radio	Virgin Records, EMI
Europe	October 25, 2010	Contemporary hit radio	Virgin Records, EMI
