= To the Edge of the Earth =

EP by Thirty Seconds to Mars
- Released: March 25, 2008
- Length: 24:39
- Label: Virgin
- Producer: Josh Abraham; Thirty Seconds to Mars

Thirty Seconds to Mars chronology
AOL Sessions Undercover (2007)	To the Edge of the Earth (2008)	This Is War (2009)

To the Edge of the Earth is a limited edition extended play (EP) by American rock band Thirty Seconds to Mars, released in the United States on March 25, 2008, by Virgin Records. The two-disc set includes three different recordings of the band's track "A Beautiful Lie" and a DVD featuring two versions of the song's music video. The photography for the release was handled by Jacques Descloitres from NASA, who provided satellite images of the Arctic Circle.

To the Edge of the Earth was conceived in support to the environmental campaign which Thirty Seconds to Mars began with the release of their single "A Beautiful Lie" (2007). It was enclosed as a digipak made of environmentally friendly material. Lead vocalist Jared Leto filmed a music video for the song in Greenland, which has been credited for raising public awareness of global warming and green politics.

== Background ==
Thirty Seconds to Mars released "A Beautiful Lie" as the fourth and final single from their second album of the same name in December 2007. Upon release, the band launched a website, called abeautifullie.org, to provide information about environmental issues and ways to participate in environmental activities. People could make donations through the site to support the Natural Resources Defense Council (NRDC). On January 30, 2008, an accompanying music video for the song premiered on Myspace. It was filmed 200 miles north of the Arctic Circle in Greenland and was directed by Jared Leto under the pseudonym of Angakok Panipaq, a character from the Inuit children's book Spirits in the Snowhouse: the Inuit Angakok. The short film features an Earth conservation message with a global warming awareness theme and proceeds from its sales benefited the Natural Resources Defense Council.

"A Beautiful Lie" preceded the extended play To the Edge of the Earth, released on March 25, 2008, by Virgin Records as a limited edition two-disc set. It was conceived as a follow-up to band's environmental campaign. The extended play consists of two discs. The first, which is a compact disc, includes two different studio versions of "A Beautiful Lie", as well as an acoustic live rendition of the song, which was recorded at the EMI Studios in Paris, France, by Guy Teixeira and Serge Veneruso. The second disc is a DVD, containing an extended and a short version of the music video accompanying the song. Bartholomew Cubbins, Leto's Dr. Seuss-inspired pseudonym, is credited as executive producer.

== Production ==
Thirty Seconds to Mars began working on the project in early 2007. They found difficulties in recruiting a production company for the shooting of "A Beautiful Lie" since most operators passed on the project, who considered it to be risky and dangerous. After six months, Yamani Watkins and Edy Enriquez attached to produce, while Elliott Lester was set to co-direct the short film. The crew spent a month in Ilulissat, Greenland, preparing pre-production; almost 200 different kinds of insurance were required to shoot the video. Determined to offset the impact of filming on the environment, Thirty Seconds to Mars worked with the Natural Resources Defense Council on strategies that minimized fuel consumption on the shoot, using renewable energy products. Jared Leto described the whole project as "one of the most painstaking and difficult creative challenge we have ever undertaken as a band. It has also been one of the most inspiring – a rare opportunity to reach into our imagination and push the limits of what's possible." The short film for "A Beautiful Lie" marked the first music video entirely shot on location 200 miles north of the Arctic Circle in Greenland.

To the Edge of the Earth was printed on post-consumer waste paper using minimal volatile organic compound inks and included a package made of ecological friendly materials. The photography for the extended play was handled by Jacques Descloitres, a photographer working within the NASA's Goddard Space Flight Center, with additional works produced by the band's previous collaborator Sean Mosher-Smith of the Echo Designlab. Descloitres provided satellite images of different areas of the Arctic Circle based largely on observations from the moderate-resolution imaging spectroradiometer.

== Reception ==
Karl Burkart from Mother Nature Network deemed it as "one of the most eye-catching" works of art displayed at the 2009 opening of the Lofts at Cherokee Studios in Los Angeles. A writer from Rock Sound commended the band's commitment in promoting environmental awareness through the medium of music. Kara DiCamillo from TreeHugger felt that the band undertook a different path than the norm and stated, "they were compelled and inspired to make an environmental statement because global warming is currently affecting this beautiful landscape and the people who live there. They wanted to take their experience and inspire all of us as well. And we believe they have succeeded."

Kristi Kates from the Northern Express stated that the short film for "A Beautiful Lie" continued the band's "burgeoning tradition of shooting videos in unusual locations", referring to their previous work on "From Yesterday" (2006). Laura Malesich from Green Daily noted that Thirty Seconds to Mars actively brought attention to environmental issues and tried to "encourage younger generations to participate in eco-activities and conservation." A writer of MTV noticed the band's attempt to "raise awareness" about global warming. Upon release, "A Beautiful Lie" was met with widespread critical acclaim, resulting in various accolades, including the MTV Europe Music Award for Best Video.

== Track listing ==
To the Edge of the Earth – Disc 1 (CD)
No.	Title	Length
1.	"A Beautiful Lie"	4:06
2.	"A Beautiful Lie" (Single Shot Version)	4:05
3.	"A Beautiful Lie" (Live Acoustic Version)	3:42

To the Edge of the Earth – Disc 2 (DVD)
No.	Title	Length
1.	"A Beautiful Lie" (Extended Version)	7:59
2.	"A Beautiful Lie" (Short Edit)	4:46
Total length:		24:39

== Credits and personnel ==
Credits adapted from To the Edge of the Earth album liner notes.

- Thirty Seconds to Mars – performer; production on tracks 1–2
- Josh Abraham – production on tracks 1–2
- Bartholomew Cubbins – executive production
- Jacques Descloitres – photography
- Brian Gardner – mastering on track 1
- Jared Leto – songwriting
- Chris Lord-Alge – mixing on track 2
- Stephen Marcussen – mastering on track 2
- Sean Mosher-Smith – design
- Guy Teixeira – recording and mixing on track 3
- Serge Veneruso – recording and mixing on track 3
- Ryan Williams – engineering on tracks 1–2; mixing on track 1
