= Lofts at Cherokee Studios =

Mixed-use development in Los Angeles, California, USA

General information
- Location: Los Angeles, CA
- Coordinates: 34.08524°N 118.36195°W
- Opened: Summer 2009

Design and construction
- Developer: REthink Development

Website
- http://www.rethinkdev.com

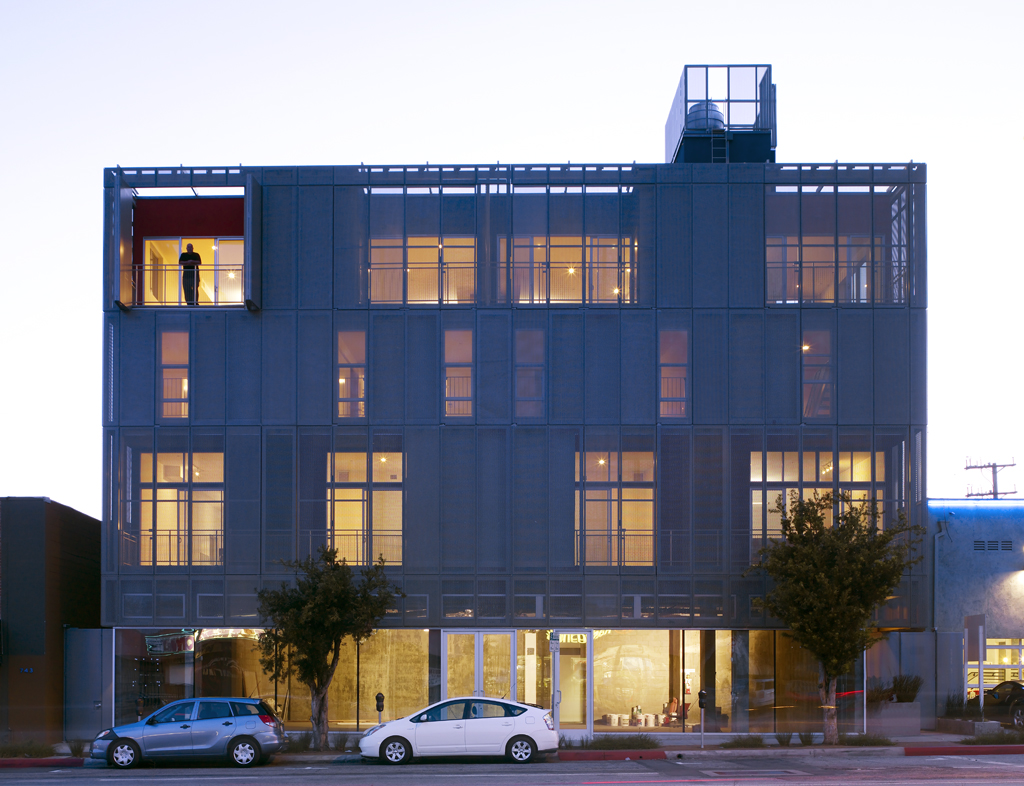

Lofts At Cherokee Studios is a mixed-use development in Los Angeles, California, featuring 12 live/work lofts and 3 commercial condominiums. The original project closed in 2007, to transform into the first LEED Platinum certified mixed-use development. The site was a recording studio doing business as Cherokee Studios, recording home to over 300 gold and platinum records as well as numerous film soundtracks. The site is also the former home of MGM Recording Studios.

== Redevelopment ==
Cherokee's founders, the Robb Brothers alongside acoustician '"George Augspurger"', Lawrence Scarpa '"Pugh + Scarpa Architects"' and '"REthink Development"' designed live/work lofts in the spirit of Cherokee (recording) Studios' Studio 1. The enhanced sound control measures and unit layouts are designed for private, home living, recording and production. The two, premium units feature dedicated music production control, isolation, and tracking space already built to professional home studio specifications. Other units can quickly be adapted for music production.

The new lofts consists of 12 condominium live/work lofts and 2,800 square feet (260 m^{2}) of retail space. The building is 5 stories, including 1 underground level of parking, first floor retail and parking, 3 floors of lofts on floors 2 though 4 as well as a rooftop deck and green roof.

The individual recording spaces are designed for artists and professionals in the creative industries. Musicians, composers, producers as well as film and television animators, directors and editors can fulfill their work duties in these studios. The recording space was designed by leading acoustician George Augspurger with Cherokee Studios founder and multi-platinum producer-engineer Bruce Robb.

== Green Building ==
Cherokee Studios is the first mixed-use building designed for LEED Platinum certification. The U.S. Green Building Council's Leadership in Energy and Environmental Design (or, LEED) is the world's premier and most rigorous green building rating system. LEED rates buildings on their ability to reduce impacts from energy, materials, water and transportation while improving the health of the indoor and urban environments. Platinum is the highest certification level achievable.
