= Into the Wild Tour =

2010–11 concert tour by Thirty Seconds to Mars

- Tour by Thirty Seconds to Mars
- Promotional poster for 2010 tour
- Associated album: This Is War
- Start date: February 19, 2010
- End date: December 9, 2011
- Legs: 19
- No. of shows: 117 in Europe; 112 in North America; 9 in Australasia; 3 in Africa; 16 in Asia; 5 in South America; 304 in total

Thirty Seconds to Mars concert chronology
- A Beautiful Lie Tour (2007–08); Into the Wild Tour (2010–11); Love, Lust, Faith and Dreams Tour (2013–15)

The Into the Wild Tour (also known as Hurricane Tour and the Closer to the Edge Tour) was the second worldwide concert tour by American rock band Thirty Seconds to Mars in support of the band's third studio album, This Is War. The tour reached the Americas, Europe, Africa, Asia and Australasia over a two-year period and it marks the first major concert tour the band has performed in North America and Australia. Along with playing arenas and amphitheatres, the tour headlined at several festivals in Europe and Australia. The tour's namesake derives from a song entitled, "The Mission", that appears on the band's eponymous debut album.

== Background ==
The tour was announced in November 2009 chronicling tour dates in England and Scotland. Within the following months, the tour was expanded to include additional dates in Europe, as well as, North America and Australia. In an interview with MTV News, frontman Jared Leto described the tour as an emotional celebration stating,

When you go out on the road, it is kind of a venture into the wild. You're with this group of pirates, from your crew to your bandmates, and you share this insane journey around the world. It's quite unlike anything else. We did a lot of shows to 20 people in a bar who were more interested in cheap drinks than they were the band. We're really excited and we're grateful for it, and we don't take it for granted at all. I remember just a few years ago there was a show where we sold 800 tickets and we couldn't believe it. The very first show on this tour is 8,000 people, and the next day there's gonna be 11,000 people there. I'm going to have to get my voice in shape!

Leto updated fans on the tour via Twitter, where we would post status updates and pictures of rehearsals. On MARS' official website provide printable flyers for each gigs so fans and spectators can help promote the concert for their area. Additionally, the band created a weekly blog for MTV Transmission to chronicle behind the scenes adventures.

=== Guinness World Record ===
On October 16, 2011, 30 Seconds to Mars announced that they planned to break the world record for most live shows during a single album cycle, with 300 shows. The 300th show took place on December 7, 2011, and the date marked the second anniversary of the album's release in the UK and other parts of Europe and ended a special week-long series of shows in New York and mark the end of the Into the Wild Tour.

=== VyRT ===
On the 24th November 2011, Jared posted on his Twitter page "The second secret is coming soon! #VyRT". This caused strong speculation within the echelon about various possible meanings; the most discussed that the Mars300 show would be streamed live for fans around the world. This turned out to be correct. 30 Seconds to Mars joined with uStream so that the Mars300 show would be streamed in HD around the world, including backstage footage and q + a sessions. This is the first time this has taken place.

== Opening act ==
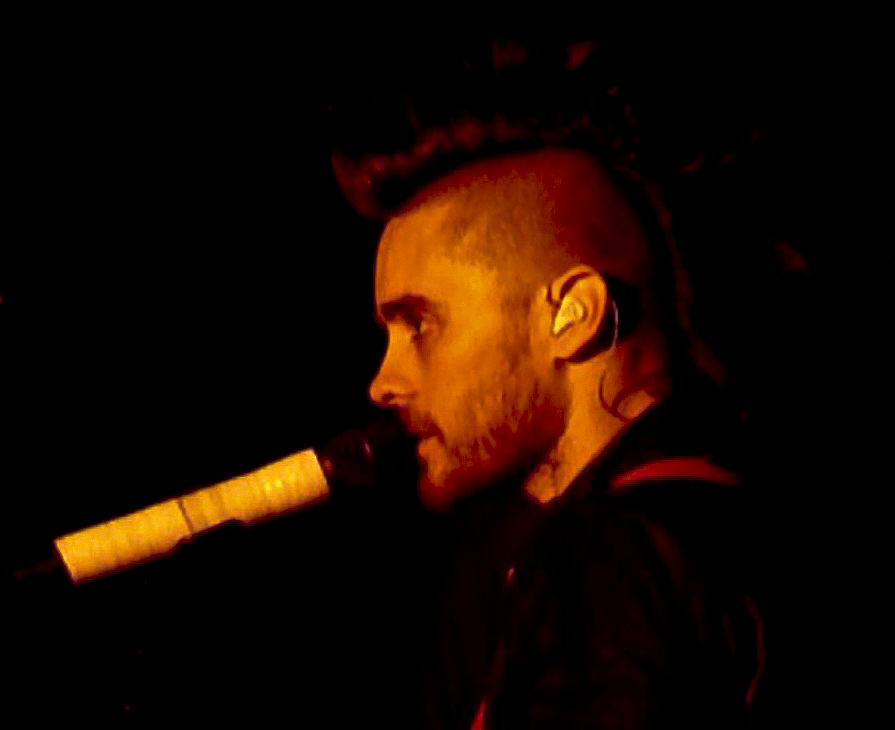
Leto performing A Modern Myth in Nottingham during the first show of the Into The Wild Tour

- Lostalone (Europe—Leg 1) (select dates)
- Street Drum Corps (Europe—Leg 1) (North America—Leg 1) (select dates)
- Fox Avenue (Ireland—February 2010)
- Carpark North (Europe—Leg 1) (select dates)
- Neon Trees (North America—Leg 1 and Leg 2) (select dates)
- Mutemath (North America—Leg 1) (select dates)
- Shiny Toy Guns (Los Angeles—May 2010)
- New Politics (North America—Leg 2) (select dates)
- Violent Soho (North America—Leg 2) (select dates)
- BLK JKS (Africa—Leg 1)
- Enter Shikari (Europe—Leg 3) (select dates)
- Funeral Party (Europe—Leg 3) (select dates)

== Set list ==
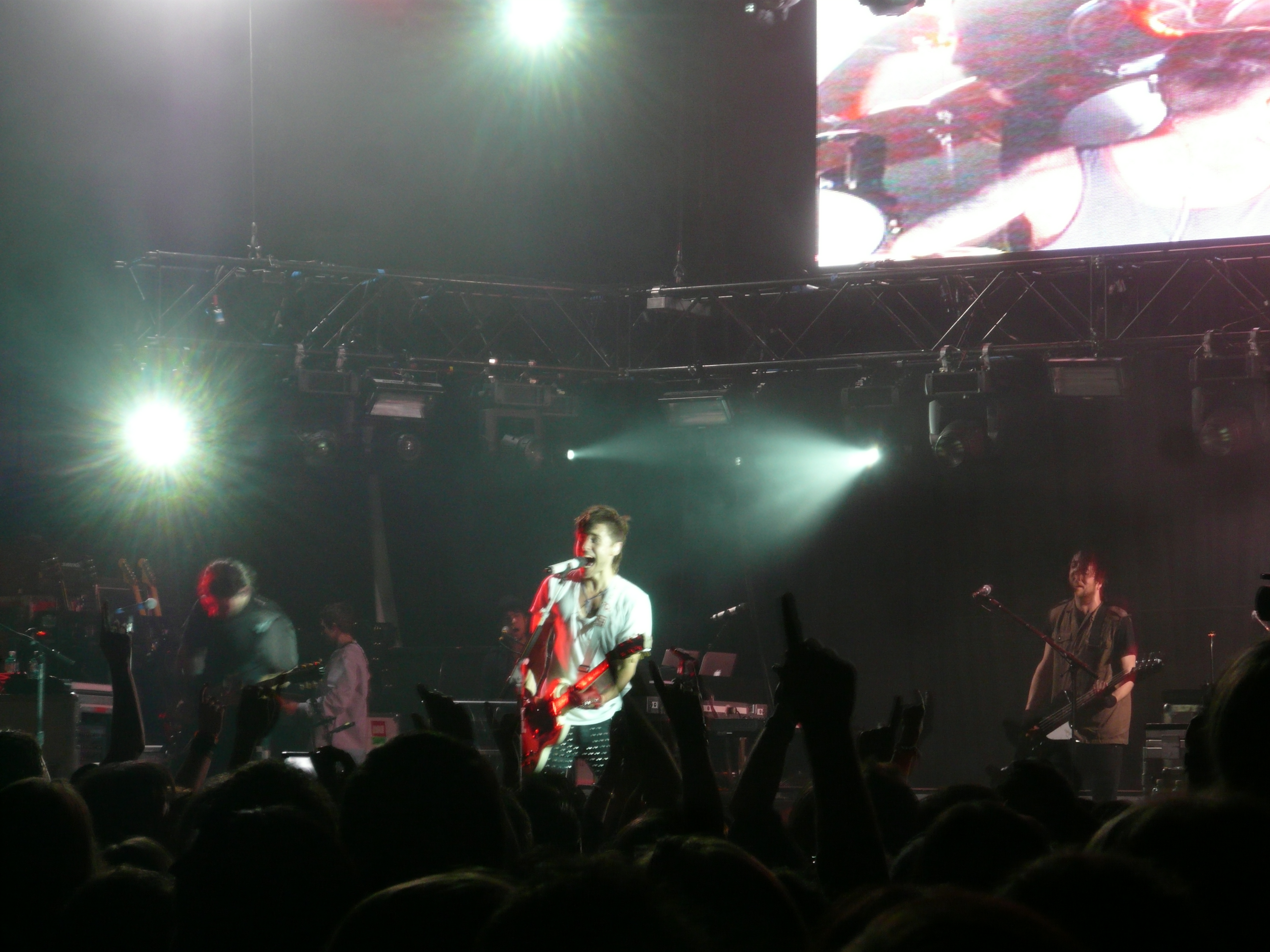
MARS performing in Zürich, Switzerland

Europe

United Kingdom: Leg 1

1. "Escape"
2. "Night of the Hunter"
3. "Attack"
4. "Vox Populi"
5. "From Yesterday"
6. "A Beautiful Lie"
7. "This Is War"
8. "100 Suns"
9. "L490"
10. "Capricorn (A Brand New Name)"
11. "Was It a Dream?"
12. "A Modern Myth"
13. "Closer to the Edge"
14. "The Kill"
15. "Buddha for Mary"
16. "The Fantasy"

Encore

17. "Hurricane"
18. "Kings and Queens"

United Kingdom: Leg 2

1. "Escape"
2. "Night of the Hunter"
3. "A Beautiful Lie"
4. "Attack"
5. "Search and Destroy"
6. "Vox Populi"
7. "This Is War"
8. "100 Suns"
9. "Closer to the Edge"
10. "L490"
11. "From Yesterday" (Acoustic)
12. "Capricorn (A Brand New Name)"
13. "Alibi"
14. "Bad Romance"
15. "The Kill"
16. "The Fantasy"

Encore

17. "Hurricane"
18. "Kings and Queens"

Continental Europe: Leg 1

1. "Escape"
2. "Night of the Hunter"
3. "Attack"
4. "Vox Populi"
5. "From Yesterday"
6. "A Beautiful Lie"
7. "This Is War"
8. "100 Suns"
9. "L490"
10. "Hurricane"
11. "Alibi"
12. "Revenge"
13. "The Kill"
14. "Closer to the Edge"
15. "Search and Destroy"
16. "The Fantasy"

Encore

17. "Kings and Queens"

Notes

- Message in a Bottle was performed at the Volkshaus in Zürich, Switzerland
- "Whole Lotta Love" was performed at PalaSharp in Milan, Italy
North America

Leg 1

1. "Escape"
2. "Night of the Hunter"
3. "Attack"
4. "Vox Populi"
5. "Search and Destroy"
6. "This Is War"
7. "100 Suns"
8. "L490"
9. "Bad Romance"
10. "Capricorn (A Brand New Name)"
11. "The Story"
12. "Alibi"
13. "The Kill"
14. "Closer to the Edge"

Encore

15. "Hurricane"
16. "Kings and Queens"

Leg 2

1. "Escape"
2. "Night of the Hunter"
3. "Attack"
4. "Vox Populi"
5. "Search and Destroy"
6. "A Beautiful Life"
7. "This Is War"
8. "Closer to the Edge"
9. "L490"
10. "From Yesterday"
11. Medley: "The Mission" / "Capricorn (A Brand New Name)"
12. "The Kill"

Encore

12. "Kings and Queens"

Leg 3

1. "Escape"
2. "Night of the Hunter"
3. "A Beautiful Life"
4. "Attack"
5. "Search and Destroy"
6. "Vox Populi"
7. "This Is War"
8. "100 Suns"
9. "Closer to the Edge"
10. "L490"
11. "From Yesterday"
12. "Alibi"
13. "Bad Romance"
14. "The Kill"
15. "The Fantasy"

Encore

16. "Hurricane"
17. "Kings and Queens"
Australia

Leg 1

1. "Escape"
2. "Night of the Hunter"
3. "Attack"
4. "Vox Populi"
5. "Search and Destroy"
6. "A Beautiful Life"
7. "This Is War"
8. "100 Suns"
9. "L490"
10. "From Yesterday"
11. "Alibi"
12. "Hurricane"
13. "Closer to the Edge"
14. "The Kill"

Encore

15. "Buddha for Mary"
16. "Capricorn (A Brand New Name)"
17. "Kings and Queens"

Soundwave Festival

1. "A Beautiful Life"
2. "Attack"
3. "Search and Destroy"
4. "This Is War"
5. "Closer to the Edge"
6. "The Kill"
7. "Kings and Queens"
Festivals

United Kingdom

1. "Escape"
2. "Night of the Hunter"
3. "Attack"
4. "Vox Populi"
5. "This Is War"
6. "Search and Destroy"
7. "Closer to the Edge"
8. "The Kill"
9. "Kings and Queens"

Continental Europe

1. "Escape"
2. "Night of the Hunter"
3. "Attack"
4. "Vox Populi"
5. "Search and Destroy"
6. "A Beautiful Lie"
7. "This Is War"
8. "100 Suns"
9. "L490"
10. "Closer to the Edge"
11. "The Kill"
12. "Kings and Queens"

Radio 1 Big Weekend

1. "Escape"
2. "This Is War"
3. "Closer to the Edge"
4. "The Kill"
5. "Kings and Queens"

Asia

1. "Escape"
2. "Night of the Hunter"
3. "Attack"
4. "Search and Destroy"
5. "This Is War"
6. "Closer to the Edge"
7. "The Kill"
8. "Kings and Queens"

== Tour dates ==
Date	City	Country	Venue
Europe
February 19, 2010	Nottingham	England	Trent FM Arena Nottingham
February 20, 2010	Manchester	England	Manchester Evening News Arena
February 21, 2010	Cardiff	Wales	Cardiff International Arena
February 23, 2010	London	England	Wembley Arena
February 24, 2010	Bournemouth	England	Windsor Hall
February 26, 2010	Dublin	Ireland	The O_{2}
February 27, 2010	Glasgow	Scotland	Scottish Exhibition and Conference Centre
March 1, 2010	Brussels	Belgium	Forest National
March 2, 2010	Amsterdam	Netherlands	Heineken Music Hall
March 4, 2010	Lille	France	L'Aéronef
March 5, 2010	Paris	France	Palais Omnisports de Paris-Bercy
March 6, 2010	Düsseldorf	Germany	Philips Halle
March 8, 2010	Hamburg	Germany	Alsterdorfer Sporthalle
March 9, 2010	Copenhagen	Denmark	K.B. Hallen
March 10, 2010	Stockholm	Sweden	Fryshuset Arena
March 12, 2010	Helsinki	Finland	Helsinki Ice Hall
March 14, 2010	Saint Petersburg	Russia	St. Petersburg Sports Arena
March 17, 2010	Berlin	Germany	Arena Berlin
March 18, 2010	Prague	Czech Republic	Incheba Expo Praha Arena
March 19, 2010	Vienna	Austria	Gasometer
March 21, 2010	Munich	Germany	Zenith Munich
March 22, 2010	Milan	Italy	PalaSharp
March 23, 2010	Zürich	Switzerland	Volkshaus
North America
April 9, 2010	Paradise	United States	Pearl Concert Theater
April 10, 2010	Mesa	United States	Mesa Amphitheatre
April 11, 2010^{[A]}	Tucson	United States	Pima County Fairgrounds Great Stage
April 13, 2010	Tulsa	United States	Brady Theater
April 15, 2010	Milwaukee	United States	Eagles Ballroom
April 16, 2010	Chicago	United States	Aragon Ballroom
April 17, 2010	Detroit	United States	The Fillmore Detroit
April 18, 2010	Toronto	Canada	Sound Academy
April 20, 2010	Boston	United States	House of Blues
April 21, 2010	New York City	United States	Roseland Ballroom
April 22, 2010	Montclair	United States	Wellmont Theatre
April 23, 2010	Washington, D.C.	United States	Bender Arena
April 24, 2010	Philadelphia	United States	Electric Factory
April 27, 2010	Miami	United States	The Fillmore Miami Beach
April 28, 2010	Orlando	United States	House of Blues
April 29, 2010	Atlanta	United States	The Tabernacle
May 1, 2010^{[B]}	Frisco	United States	Pizza Hut Park
May 4, 2010	St. Louis	United States	The Pageant
May 6, 2010	Omaha	United States	Sokol Auditorium
May 7, 2010	Denver	United States	Fillmore Auditorium
May 8, 2010	Salt Lake City	United States	The Rail Event Center
May 10, 2010	Seattle	United States	Showbox SoDo
May 11, 2010	Portland	United States	Roseland Theatre
May 13, 2010	Oakland	United States	Fox Oakland Theatre
May 14, 2010	Santa Barbara	United States	Santa Barbara Bowl
May 15, 2010	Los Angeles	United States	Greek Theatre
May 16, 2010	Tempe	United States	Marquee Theatre
Europe		United States	
May 23, 2010^{[C]}	Bangor	Wales	Vaynol Estate
North America
May 29, 2010	Allentown	United States	Crocodile Rock Cafe
May 30, 2010^{[D]}	Durham	United States	Durham Fairgrounds
Europe
June 3, 2010	Frankfurt	Germany	Batschkapp
June 4, 2010	Frankfurt	Germany	Batschkapp
June 5, 2010^{[E]}	Nürburg	Germany	Nürburgring
June 6, 2010^{[F]}	Nuremberg	Germany	Zeppelinfield
June 8, 2010^{[G]}	Tilburg	Netherlands	Dommelsch Zaal
June 10, 2010^{[J]}	Crans-près-Céligny	Switzerland	Port de Crans
June 12, 2010^{[K]}	Leicestershire	England	Donington Park
June 15, 2010	Dortmund	Germany	Westfalenhalle
June 16, 2010	Leipzig	Germany	Haus Auensee
June 18, 2010^{[L]}	Seinäjoki	Finland	Törnävä Festival Park
June 20, 2010^{[M]}	Gothenburg	Sweden	Frihamnen
June 22, 2010	Bielefeld	Germany	Ringlokschuppen Bielefeld
June 25, 2010^{[N]}	St. Gallen	Switzerland	Sitter Valley
June 26, 2010^{[O]}	Enschede	Netherlands	Volkspark
June 27, 2010^{[P]}	Roeser	Luxembourg	Rue de la Montagne
June 29, 2010	Toulouse	France	Le Bikini
June 30, 2010	Clermont-Ferrand	France	La Coopérative de Mai
July 2, 2010^{[Q]}	Werchter	Belgium	Werchter Festival Grounds
July 4, 2010^{[R]}	Venice	Italy	San Giuliano Park
July 10, 2010^{[S]}	Perth and Kinross	Scotland	Balado
July 11, 2010^{[T]}	Kildare	Ireland	Punchestown Racecourse
Australasia
July 24, 2010	Perth	Australia	Challenge Stadium
July 28, 2010	Melbourne	Australia	Festival Hall
July 30, 2010	Sydney	Australia	Hordern Pavilion
August 3, 2010	Auckland	New Zealand	Logan Campbell Centre
Asia
August 5, 2010^{[U]}	Central Area	Singapore	Fort Canning Park
August 7, 2010^{[V]}	Chiba	Japan	Makuhari Messe
August 8, 2010^{[V]}	Osaka	Japan	Maishima Summer Sonic Site
Europe
August 13, 2010^{[W]}	Budapest	Hungary	Óbuda Island
August 18, 2010	Tel Aviv	Israel	Trade Fairs & Convention Center
August 20, 2010^{[X]}	Kraków	Poland	Polish Aviation Museum
August 21, 2010^{[Y]}	Sankt Pölten	Austria	Green Park
August 22, 2010^{[Z]}	Biddinghuizen	Netherlands	Spijk en Bremerberg
North America
August 26, 2010^{[AA]}	Mexico City	Mexico	Auditorio Nacional
August 30, 2010^{[AB]}	Syracuse	United States	Stan Colella Stage at Chevy Court
September 1, 2010	Baltimore	United States	Sonar
September 2, 2010	Myrtle Beach	United States	House of Blues
September 3, 2010	Norfolk	United States	Norva Theatre
September 4, 2010	Atlantic City	United States	House of Blues
September 5, 2010	Hampton	United States	Hampton Beach Casino Ballroom
September 6, 2010^{[AC]}	Gatineau	Canada	Jacques Cartier Park
September 8, 2010	Providence	United States	Lupo's Heartbreak Hotel
September 9, 2010	Hartford	United States	Webster Theater
September 20, 2010	Edmonton	Canada	Edmonton Events Centre
September 21, 2010	Calgary	Canada	MacEwan Hall
September 22, 2010	Vancouver	Canada	Queen Elizabeth Theatre
September 23, 2010	Medford	United States	Medford Armory
September 25, 2010^{[AD]}	Orem	United States	UCCU Center
September 26, 2010^{[AE]}	Fontana	United States	Auto Club Speedway
September 29, 2010^{[AD]}	Kingsville	United States	University Boulevard
September 30, 2010	Oklahoma City	United States	Diamond Ballroom
October 8, 2010^{[AD]}	Kent	United States	Memorial Athletic and Convocation Center
October 15, 2010^{[AD]}	Tampa	United States	USF Sun Dome
October 16, 2010^{[AF]}	Pensacola	United States	Casino Beach
Europe
October 19, 2010^{[AG]}	Lincoln	England	Engine Shed
North America
October 22, 2010	Cleveland	United States	House of Blues
October 23, 2010	Cincinnati	United States	Bogart's
October 24, 2010	Pittsburgh	United States	Club Zoo
October 26, 2010	Minneapolis	United States	First Avenue
October 27, 2010	Indianapolis	United States	Egyptian Room
October 31, 2010	Nashville	United States	Rocketown
November 1, 2010	Charlotte	United States	The Fillmore
November 2, 2010	Columbus	United States	Lifestyle Communities Pavilion
Africa
November 19, 2010	Johannesburg	South Africa	Coca-Cola Dome
November 20, 2010	Cape Town	South Africa	Grand Arena at Grand West Casino
November 21, 2010	Cape Town	South Africa	Grand Arena at Grand West Casino
Europe
November 25, 2010	Brighton	England	The Brighton Centre
November 26, 2010	Cardiff	Wales	Cardiff International Arena
November 27, 2010	Newcastle	England	Metro Radio Arena
November 29, 2010	Brighton	England	The Brighton Centre
November 30, 2010	London	England	The O_{2}
December 1, 2010	Birmingham	England	National Indoor Arena
December 3, 2010	Aberdeen	Scotland	Press & Journal Arena
December 4, 2010	Manchester	England	Manchester Central
December 6, 2010	Oberhausen	Germany	König-Pilsener Arena
December 7, 2010	Basel	Switzerland	St. Jakobshalle
December 8, 2010	Bologna	Italy	Futurshow Station
December 10, 2010	Moscow	Russia	Olimpiyskiy
December 12, 2010	Kyiv	Ukraine	International Exhibition Center
December 14, 2010	Warsaw	Poland	Torwar Hall
December 16, 2010	Lisbon	Portugal	Pavilhão Atlântico
December 17, 2010	Madrid	Spain	Palacio Vistalegre
December 18, 2010	Barcelona	Spain	Sant Jordi Club
Australasia
February 26, 2011^{[AH]}	Brisbane	Australia	Brisbane Exhibition Ground
February 27, 2011^{[AH]}	Sydney	Australia	Eastern Creek Raceway
March 4, 2011^{[AH]}	Melbourne	Australia	Royal Melbourne Showgrounds
March 5, 2011^{[AH]}	Adelaide	Australia	Bonython Park
March 7, 2011^{[AH]}	Perth	Australia	Steel Blue Oval
Hurricane Tour
North America
December 31, 2010	Paradise	United States	Pearl Concert Theater
January 11, 2011	San Diego	United States	House of Blues
January 12, 2011	San Diego	United States	House of Blues
January 14, 2011	Pomona	United States	Fox Theater
January 16, 2011	Davis	United States	Freeborn Hall
January 18, 2011	Seattle	United States	Paramount Theatre
January 21, 2011	Denver	United States	Fillmore Auditorium
January 23, 2011	Dallas	United States	House of Blues
January 24, 2011	Dallas	United States	House of Blues
January 25, 2011	Austin	United States	Austin Music Hall
January 26, 2011	Houston	United States	Verizon Wireless Theater
January 28, 2011	Atlanta	United States	The Tabernacle
January 30, 2011	Louisville	United States	Expo Five Expo Dome
January 31, 2011	Richmond	United States	The National
February 2, 2011	Niagara Falls	United States	Rapids Theatre
February 3, 2011	Rochester	United States	Main Street Armory
February 4, 2011	Clifton Park	United States	Northern Lights
February 5, 2011	Wallingford	United States	Oakdale Theatre
February 8, 2011	Mexico City	Mexico	José Cuervo Salón
February 9, 2011	Mexico City	Mexico	José Cuervo Salón
Asia
March 10, 2011	Muscat	Oman	InterContinental Gardens
March 11, 2011	Abu Dhabi	United Arab Emirates	Du Arena
South America
March 27, 2011	São Paulo	Brazil	HSBC Hall
March 29, 2011	Rio de Janeiro	Brazil	Vivo Rio
April 1, 2011	Buenos Aires	Argentina	Luna Park
April 3, 2011^{[AI]}	Santiago	Chile	O'Higgins Park
April 4, 2011	Bogotá	Colombia	Palacio de Los Deportes
Closer to the Edge Tour
North America
April 8, 2011	San Jose	United States	Event Center Arena
April 9, 2011	Los Angeles	United States	Gibson Amphitheatre
April 12, 2011	Colorado Springs	United States	Colorado Springs City Auditorium
April 14, 2011	Chicago	United States	Aragon Ballroom
April 15, 2011	Kenosha	United States	Tarble Athletic Center
April 16, 2011	Detroit	United States	The Fillmore Detroit
April 17, 2011	Champaign	United States	Assembly Hall
April 18, 2011	St. Louis	United States	The Pageant
April 19, 2011	Grand Rapids	United States	The Orbit Room
April 20, 2011	Indiana	United States	Ed Fry Arena
April 22, 2011	Raleigh	United States	Raleigh Amphitheater
April 23, 2011^{[AJ]}	Orlando	United States	Universal Music Plaza Stage
April 24, 2011	Boca Raton	United States	Sunset Cove Amphitheater
April 26, 2011	Morgantown	United States	WVU Coliseum
April 27, 2011	Fairfax	United States	Patriot Center
April 29, 2011^{[AK]}	East Rutherford	United States	Meadowlands Sports Complex
April 30, 2011	Camden	United States	Susquehanna Bank Center
May 1, 2011	Boston	United States	Agganis Arena
May 3, 2011	Montreal	Canada	Métropolis
May 5, 2011	Toronto	Canada	Kool Haus
May 6, 2011	Montreal	Canada	Métropolis
May 7, 2011	Quebec City	Canada	Pavillon de la Jeunesse
May 8, 2011	Portland	United States	State Theatre
May 22, 2011	San Juan	Puerto Rico	José Miguel Agrelot Coliseum
May 28, 2011	Paradise	United States	Chateau Nightclub & Gardens
June 4, 2011^{[AL]}	Tinley Park	United States	First Midwest Bank Amphitheatre
Europe
June 10, 2011^{[AM]}	Zagreb	Croatia	Dvorište Jedinstva
June 11, 2011^{[AN]}	Nickelsdorf	Austria	Pannonia Fields II
June 12, 2011	Innsbruck	Austria	Olympiahalle Innsbruck
June 13, 2011^{[AO]}	Landgraaf	Netherlands	Megaland Landgaaf
June 15, 2011	Paris	France	L'Olympia
June 16, 2011^{[AP]}	Sursee	Switzerland	Sursee Stadthalle
June 17, 2011	Milan	Italy	Fiera Open Air Arena
June 18, 2011	Rome	Italy	Capannelle Racecourse
June 21, 2011	Tallinn	Estonia	Tallinn Song Festival Grounds
June 23, 2011^{[AP]}	Prague	Czech Republic	Incheba Expo Praha Exhibition Grounds
June 25, 2011^{[AQ]}	Razlog	Bulgaria	Razlog Valley
June 28, 2011^{[AR]}	Arendal	Norway	Tromøya
June 30, 2011^{[AS]}	Borlänge	Sweden	Borlänge Centrumförening
July 2, 2011^{[AT]}	Sopron	Hungary	Lővér Kemping
July 6, 2011	Athens	Greece	Water Square
July 8, 2011^{[AU]}	Oeiras	Portugal	Passeio Marítimo de Alges
July 9, 2011^{[AV]}	Bilbao	Spain	Kobeta Mendi
July 13, 2011	Saint Petersburg	Russia	Стадион Телебашня
Asia
July 15, 2011	Byblos	Lebanon	Unesco Square
July 22, 2011^{[AW]}	Jakarta	Indonesia	Carnaval Beach
July 24, 2011^{[AA]}	Shah Alam	Malaysia	I-City CityPark
July 26, 2011	Kowloon	Hong Kong	Star Hall
July 29, 2011	Quezon City	Philippines	TriNoma Activity Center
July 31, 2011^{[AX]}	Taipei	Taiwan	Studio 18
Europe
August 11, 2011^{[AY]}	Stuttgart	Germany	Schlossplatz
August 12, 2011	Nuremberg	Germany	Nuremberg Arena
August 13, 2011^{[W]}	Budapest	Hungary	Óbuda Island
August 16, 2011^{[AZ]}	Belfast	Northern Ireland	Custom House Square
August 19, 2011^{[BA]}	Lüdinghausen	Germany	Flugplatz Borkenberge
August 20, 2011^{[BB]}	Großpösna	Germany	Störmthaler See
August 23, 2011	Hamburg	Germany	Trabrennbahn Bahrenfeld
August 24, 2011	Mannheim	Germany	SAP Arena
August 26, 2011^{[BC]}	Reading	England	Little John's Farm
August 27, 2011^{[BD]}	Leeds	England	Bramham Park
North America
September 2, 2011	Highland	United States	Yuhaviatam Room at San Manuel Casino
September 4, 2011	Stateline	United States	MontBleu Theater
Asia
September 17, 2011^{[BE]}	Beijing	China	Chaoyang Sports Centre
September 18, 2011^{[BE]}	Shanghai	China	Shanghai Ruike Field
September 21, 2011	Nagoya	Japan	Club Diamond Hall
September 22, 2011	Osaka	Japan	Matsushita IMP Hall
September 23, 2011	Tokyo	Japan	Studio Coast
North America
September 29, 2011	Honolulu	United States	The Waterfront
October 22, 2011^{[BF]}	Mexico City	Mexico	Palacio de los Deportes
October 23, 2011^{[BF]}	León	Mexico	Poliforum León
Europe
November 2, 2011	Riga	Latvia	Arena Riga
November 3, 2011	Vilnius	Lithuania	Siemens Arena
November 4, 2011	Minsk	Belarus	Minsk Sports Palace
November 7, 2011	Łódź	Poland	Atlas Arena
November 8, 2011	Łódź	Poland	Atlas Arena
November 11, 2011	Paris	France	Zénith de Paris
November 12, 2011	Paris	France	Zénith de Paris
November 13, 2011	Nantes	France	Zénith de Nantes Métropole
November 15, 2011	Bordeaux	France	L'Espace Médoquine
November 16, 2011	Toulouse	France	Le Phare
November 18, 2011	Lille	France	Zénith de Lille
November 19, 2011	Metz	France	Galaxie Amnéville
November 20, 2011	Lyon	France	Le Transbordeur
November 22, 2011	Montpellier	France	Zénith Sud
November 23, 2011	Marseille	France	Le Dôme de Marseille
November 25, 2011	Hohenems	Austria	Tennis Event Center
November 26, 2011	Vienna	Austria	Wiener Stadthalle
November 28, 2011	Frankfurt	Germany	Festhalle Frankfurt
November 29, 2011	Cologne	Germany	Lanxess Arena
November 30, 2011	Antwerp	Belgium	Lotto Arena
December 3, 2011	Schladming	Austria	Planai-Stadion
United States
December 6, 2011	New York City	United States	Hammerstein Ballroom
December 7, 2011	New York City	United States	Hammerstein Ballroom
December 8, 2011	New York City	United States	St. Peter's Episcopal Church
December 9, 2011	New York City	United States	St. Peter's Episcopal Church

Music festivals and other miscellaneous performances

^{A} This concert is a part of the KFMA Day Festival
^{B} This concert is a part of Edge 102.1 Edgefest 20
^{C} This concert is part of the Radio 1's Big Weekend Music Festival.
^{D} This concert is a part of B.O.M.B. Fest.
^{E} This concert is a part of Rock am Ring
^{F} This concert is a part of Rock im Park
^{G} This concert is a part of the 013 Festival
^{J} This concert is a part of Caribana Festival
^{K} This concert is a part of the Download Festival
^{L} This concert is a part of Provinssirock Festival
^{M} This concert is a part of Pier Pressure Festival.
^{N} This concert is a part of the Open Air St. Gallen
^{O} This concert is a part of the TMF Awards Festival
^{P} This concert is a part of Rock a Field Music Festival
^{Q} This concert is a part of Rock Werchter
^{R} This concert is a part of Heineken Jammin' Festival
^{S} This concert was a part of T in the Park
^{T} This concert is a part of Oxegen Festival
^{U} This concert is a part of Singfest
^{V} These concerts were a part of Summer Sonic Festival
^{W} This concert is a part of Sziget Festival
^{X} This concert is a part of Coke Live Festival
^{Y} This concert is a part of Frequency Festival
^{Z} This concert is a part of Lowlands Festival
^{AA} These concerts are a part MTV World Stage
^{AB} This concert is a part of the Great New York State Fair
^{AC} This concert is a part of the University of Ottawa 101 Week Fedstock
^{AD} These concerts are a part of the MTV Campus Invasion Tour
^{AE} This concert is a part of Epicenter Music Festival
^{AF} This concert is a part of the DeLuna Festival
^{AG} This concert is a part of BBC Radio 1 Student Tour
^{AH} These concerts are a part of Soundwave Festival
^{AI} This concert is a part of Lollapalooza
^{AJ} This concert is a part of Universal Studios Florida Mardi Gras
^{AK} This concert is a part of the Bamboozle Music Festival
^{AL} This concert is a part of the Q101 Jamboree
^{AM} This concert is a part of the Mars Festival
^{AN} This concert is a part of the Nova Rock Festival
^{AO} This concert is a part of the Pinkpop Festival
^{AP} This concert is a part of the Prague City Festival
^{AQ} This concert is a part of the Elevation Festival
^{AR} This concert is a part of the Hove Festival
^{AS} This concert is a part of the Peace & Love Festival
^{AT} This concert is a part of the Volt Festival
^{AU} This concert is a part of the Optimus Alive! Festival
^{AV} This concert is a part of the Bilbao Live Festival
^{AW} This concert is a part of Java Rockin'Land
^{AX} This concert is a part of the "Twinkie Rock Festival"
^{AY} This concert is a part of "Stuttgarter Sternstunden"
^{AZ} This concert is a part of Belsonic
^{BA} This concert is a part of the Area 4 Festival
^{BB} This concert is a part of the Highfield Festival
^{BC} This concert is a part of the Reading Festival
^{BD} This concert is a part of the Leeds Festival
^{BE} These concerts are a part of the Black Rabbit Festival
^{BF} This concert is a part of the EXA FM Radio Festival

Cancellations and rescheduled shows

April 25, 2010	Charlotte, North Carolina	Uptown Amphitheatre	This performance was rescheduled to October 13, 2010. The venue has changed to the Fillmore Charlotte
July 7, 2010	Hultsfred, Sweden	Lake Hulingen	This concert was a part of the Hultsfred Festival. The event was cancelled due to poor ticket sales, resulting in the promoter filing for bankruptcy
September 10, 2010	Worcester, Massachusetts	Worcester Palladium	This concert has been postponed to 2011 due to scheduling conflict
September 11, 2010	Clifton Park, New York	Northern Lights	This concert has been moved to November 1, 2010
September 13, 2010	Niagara Falls, New York	Rapids Theatre	This concert was originally moved to November 3, 2010, but has now been postponed to 2011
September 14, 2010	Pittsburgh	Club Zoo	This concert has been moved to October 24, 2010
September 16, 2010	Minneapolis	First Avenue	This concert was moved to October 26, 2010
September 17, 2010	Fargo, North Dakota	The Hub Venue	This concert has been cancelled.
September 18, 2010	Winnipeg	Burton Cummings Theatre	This concert was postponed to 2011 due to scheduling conflict
September 25, 2010	Orem, Utah	Brent Brown Ballpark	This performance was moved to the UCCU Center.
September 29, 2010	Austin, Texas	La Zona Rosa	This performance was cancelled due to MARS involvement in the MTV Campus Invasion Tour.
September 29, 2010	Kingsville, Texas	Mesquite Grove	This performance was moved to a parking lot located on University Boulevard to suit a larger audience
October 2, 2010	Clive, Iowa	Seven Flags Event Center	This concert has been cancelled.
October 3, 2010	Indianapolis	Egyptian Room	This concert was moved to October 27, 2010
October 4, 2010	Murray, Kentucky	Racers Intramural Field	This concert has been cancelled. It was a part of the MTV Campus Invasion Tour.
October 6, 2010	Cleveland, Ohio	House of Blues	This concert has been moved to October 22, 2010
October 7, 2010	Columbus, Ohio	Lifestyle Communities Pavilion	This concert has been moved to November 2, 2010
October 9, 2010	Cincinnati, Ohio	Bogart's	This concert has been moved to October 23, 2010
October 9, 2010	Plymouth, Michigan	Compuware Arena	This performance was cancelled as a part of the 89X Radio Fall Festival
October 11, 2010	Louisville, Kentucky	Expo Five Expo Dome	This concert was moved to October 28, 2010, then later rescheduled to January 30, 2011.
October 12, 2010	Nashville, Tennessee	Rocketown	This concert has been moved to October 31, 2010
October 13, 2010	Charlotte, North Carolina	The Fillmore Charlotte	This concert has been moved to November 1, 2010
October 15, 2010	Tampa, Florida	Ritz Ybor	This performance was initially cancelled, however, since MARS is participating in the MTV Campus Invasion Tour 2010, the date was essentially replaced and moved to the USF Sun Dome
October 29, 2010	Champaign, Illinois	Star Theatre	This concert has been postponed and rescheduled to April 17, 2011.
November 3, 2010	Niagara Falls, New York	Rapids Theatre	This concert has been moved to February 2, 2011
November 5, 2010	Clifton Park, New York	Northern Lights	This concert has been moved to February 24, 2011
December 8, 2010	Bologna, Italy	Land Rover Arena	This concert has been moved to Futurshow Station
February 4, 2011	Cape Town, South Africa	Grand Arena at Grand West Casino	Cancelled. This performance was a part of the Coke Zero Festival
February 5, 2011	Midrand, South Africa	GCC Auditorium	Cancelled. This performance was a part of the Coke Zero Festival
August 18, 2011	Hasselt, Belgium	Kempische Steenweg	Cancelled. The concert was a part of Pukkelpop.
September 3, 2011	Las Vegas	Chateau Nightclub and Gardens	Cancelled

== Broadcasts and recordings ==
Taken from their third album, the single Closer to the Edge was released with a video that consisted of footage recorded at various concerts, appearances and festivals from the Into the Wild tour. The footage ranged from the 1st of the 300 live shows in Nottingham, England and until the shows of June 2010. The video contains interviews of fans conducted by Jared Leto backstage at various concerts.

== Critical reception ==
- Scott Kara (The New Zealand Herald) criticized the show stating Leto was the main focus of the night however, he did enjoy the band's performance. He said, "The thing is, with that mohawk and his constant 'New Zealand we love you' plaudits, 30 Seconds To Mars are more about style, showmanship, and crowd participation over substance."
- Fiona McKinlay (The Herald) praised MARS' performance in Scotland stating,"From the opening run of Escape and Night Of The Hunter to the gentle comedown that 100 Suns provided, the newer songs aspire to the same monstrous, theatrical brilliance, but quite simply do it better. They’ve grown into a more intense, more poignant, and more unpredictable force."
- Sandra Bahbah (Perth Now) wrote the performance was long-awaited but felt the show wasn't what many expected. She states, "Vocally, Leto was strong throughout the show, hitting all the high notes. The one gripe was how he kept getting the crowd to sing and sometimes they just didn't know the words. It would have been better if he had just sang a song all the way through. While his voice was loud, at times it was drowned out by the instruments, but there was no denying the stage presence of the trio and how good they were at entertaining the masses."
- Tanya Vega (Chicago Music Guide) was blown away by MARS' performance at the Aragon Ballroom stating, "Un-expect the unexpected from Jared and the guys ...meaning, it'll be hard to predict what will happen next at the Mars concert you attend compared to what happened tonight in Chicago."
