= This Is War =

Studio album by Thirty Seconds to Mars
- Released: December 8, 2009
- Studios: The International Centre for the Advancement of the Arts and Sciences of Sound (Los Angeles, California)
- Genres: Alternative rock; indie rock; experimental rock; progressive rock
- Length: 60:40
- Labels: Virgin; Immortal; EMI
- Producers: Flood; Thirty Seconds to Mars; Steve Lillywhite

Thirty Seconds to Mars chronology
| To the Edge of the Earth (2008) | This Is War (2009) | MTV Unplugged (2011) |

This Is War Deluxe edition
- Available in four colors: black/white, pink/white, blue/white, and white/black.

Singles from This Is War
- 1. "Kings and Queens" Released: October 13, 2009; 2. "This Is War" Released: March 26, 2010; 3. "Closer to the Edge" Released: August 20, 2010; 4. "Hurricane" Released: November 15, 2010; 5. "Night of the Hunter" Released: April 8, 2011 (promo)

This Is War is the third studio album by American rock band Thirty Seconds to Mars, released on December 8, 2009, through Virgin Records. It was the band's first studio album in four years, after the breakthrough of their previous work, A Beautiful Lie (2005). The album was recorded over a span of two years while the band was in the midst of a legal dispute with Virgin over an alleged breach-of-contract. The case was later settled in April 2009, and the band signed to EMI later that year.

The album marked a departure from the band's previous material, implementing a more experimental direction that draws influence from progressive rock, new wave, industrial, and heavy metal music. Lyrically, it is a conceptual record shaped by the band's personal struggles and legal battle with their record label, and is sometimes considered a rock opera. It was accompanied by the documentary film Artifact (2012), which chronicled the dispute.

This Is War received mixed reception from critics, though some praised its instrumentation and experimental direction, and was nominated for the Echo Music Prize. It reached the top ten of several national album charts and has since sold over four million copies worldwide. The record was primarily promoted through the Into the Wild Tour, which earned the band a Guinness World Record for most live shows during a single album cycle, with 300 shows.

== Background and development ==
Thirty Seconds to Mars was sued for breach-of-contract by their record label, Virgin Records, in mid-2008. The label sought $30 million in damages, claiming that the band had failed to produce three of the five records they were obliged to deliver under their 1999 contract with the now-defunct Immortal Records. In 2004, Virgin took over the contract. Jared Leto responded to some of the claims in the suit on the band's website and dismissed rumors that the group had disbanded. He said the claims were "ridiculously overblown" and "totally unrealistic", before stating that "under California law, where we live and signed our deal, one cannot be bound to a contract for more than seven years." Thirty Seconds to Mars had been contracted for nine years, so the band decided to exercise their "legal right to terminate our old, out-of-date contract, which according to the law is null and void."

After nearly a year of the lawsuit battle, the band announced on April 29, 2009, that the case had been settled. The suit was resolved following a defense based on a contract case involving actress Olivia de Havilland decades before. Leto explained, "The California Appeals Court ruled that no service contract in California is valid after seven years, and it became known as the De Havilland Law after she used it to get out of her contract with Warner Bros." Thirty Seconds to Mars then decided to re-sign with EMI (the parent label of Virgin). Leto said the band had "resolved our differences with EMI" and the decision had been made because of "the willingness and enthusiasm by EMI to address our major concerns and issues, (and) the opportunity to return to work with a team so committed and passionate about Thirty Seconds to Mars." He said it was "the most challenging business obstacle that we've ever gone through as a band."

Upon completion of the record, Leto spoke of the troubles the band faced while working on This Is War: "We spent two years of our lives working on that record, and it was us against the world... There were times that it was overwhelming. Everything that was going on was brutal... It was a case of survival, to tell the truth."

Leto produced a documentary Artifact, which depicted the state of the modern music industry through their dispute with their record company. Other musicians also gave accounts of their industry experiences. The film premiered at the 2012 Toronto International Film Festival, where it was well received and won the People's Choice Award for Best Documentary.

== Writing and recording ==
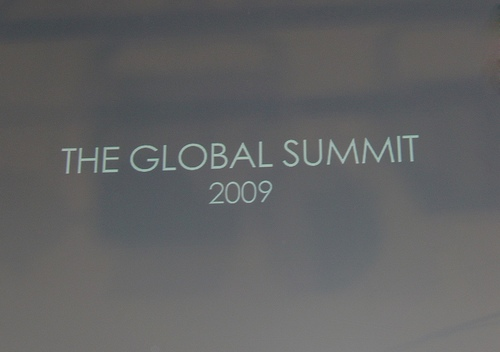
This Is War makes extensive use of choir recordings made at a fan gathering nicknamed "The Summit".

During recording sessions, the band hosted a gathering, which they called "The Summit", at the Avalon club in Los Angeles. The purpose of the gathering was to deepen the band's connection with the fans by involving them in the making of the album. Approximately 1,000 fans from across the U.S. and Europe showed up for The Summit. Their participation in the recording process ranged from providing percussion and whispers on some tracks to singing the whole chorus of a song. In an interview with MTV, frontman Jared Leto described the process as an experiment saying "It was quite simply one of the best things we've done as a band". Leto also revealed in the interview that the album's style would be leaning more towards that of their self-titled debut than that of A Beautiful Lie, with most songs clocking in over five minutes. Describing the experimental recording process, he said:

"I think we do a really good job at just chasing the feeling, the core of the song, and allowing the song the ability or right to go where it leads us, where it wants to go. The song dictates that, and we've been working on this collection of songs for 12 months, so we know them pretty well."

In May 2009, Kanye West posted a photo of himself, Brandon Flowers (the frontman of the Killers) and Jared Leto together and announced that he and Jared were working together on a song named "Hurricane". Leto later confirmed that Kanye West's vocals would appear on "Hurricane" and that West would be singing, not rapping. West's vocal contribution to the song was ultimately removed because of legal issues surrounding the rights of the record labels of each of the artists. Although it was not released on the original pressing of the album, Leto said the track would eventually be heard. The early leaked versions of the album had the version of "Hurricane" featuring Kanye West included. This version also appears on the Deluxe edition of the album.

== Musical style and themes ==
"Kings and Queens"
"Kings and Queens", the third track on the album, was partly written in South Africa.

AllMusic writer Stephen Thomas Erlewine acknowledged the band's progression since their last record; saying that it was a liability "When they were mining a post-grunge or nu metal or emo vein," but now the group has deviated to a sound that is more reminiscent of "a hybrid of the Killers' retro new wave and My Chemical Romance's gothic prog." He said following the band's transposition "they've wound up with a sound that suits their stance", referring to the record as "an ungainly mix of synth rock, metal, and prog, the distillation of all manner of brooding '80s teenage obsessions." Sara Anderson from AOL Radio referred to This Is War's "extremely progressive rock sound with killer choruses"; saying the album clearly takes inspiration from experimental Pink Floyd to melodic M83. Billboard writer Cortney Harding said the album "represented an artistic step forward for the band," observing that the band hasn't completely abandoned its melodic and hard rock tendencies. The Times described the record's sound as "a tighter, more textured set of eyeliner indie-rock tunes than the group's previous albums".

"One thing that I thought was missing from Thirty Seconds to Mars was a sense of optimism, which I think you feel on songs on this record. 'Kings and Queens,' there's a triumphant feeling of the possibilities that we all have. 'This Is War,' you feel a confidence and a celebration, and even 'Closer to the Edge'. [In the case of] 'Stranger in a Strange Land' ... the other thing I felt was missing was sexuality. And that's obviously a big part of all of our lives, and I thought it (was) important to address some of that."

— Jared Leto, Thirty Seconds to Mars lyricist and vocalist, on the themes incorporated into the record.

Thirty Seconds to Mars frontman Jared Leto described the record as a concept album, proceeding to say "if this isn't, I'm not sure what is". He said the record was created in an "intense two-year period, where it felt like the whole world was falling apart and massive changes were going on. I think you can hear that in the sound of this album." Furthermore, he refused to call the album a rock opera, "People seem OK with calling it 'a rock opera'... I would never say that though; the only thing I'm comfortable saying 'rock opera' about is Tommy by the Who. But it's very conceptual, about many spiritual things, and it really is simply who we are, who we've become."

Leto described the style as "much more electronic and experimental, with lots of vintage synths." Leto also mentioned that he had written lyrics about some themes he felt were missing from their previous work, such as optimism and sexuality only for the song "Stranger in a Strange Land". Rock Sound writer Victoria Durham referred to the dramatic themes instilled in the album, such as "Night of the Hunter" which she said "is one of the album's most dramatic efforts" and also reminiscing over their previous album, A Beautiful Lie, which he says "featured its share of over-dramatic moments, (but) this time the band have blasted them into the stratosphere. The massive-sounding 'Vox Populi' is a prime example." She reiterates Leto's claim, noting the track has a "feeling of all-conquering optimism".

The music video for the song "Hurricane" was banned by MTV and several other TV channels around the world. The video, which runs for 13 minutes and 10 seconds and was directed by Jared Leto under the pseudonym Bartholomew Cubbins, premiered on MTV on November 29, 2010. Jared stated in an interview with MTV that "I didn't expect all this to happen, but it's a good thing that it happens, only because of the conversation that it may provoke, about these sort of things, and looking at art and creative expression and weighing that against protecting the viewers from the exhibition of certain behaviors". " The video was censored and banned because of its elements of violence, nudity and sex. On November 28, 2010, Jared Leto posted the letter from MTV about the censorship of the video on his blog. The list features the offending scenes, such as a woman running her finger on the anus of another G-string woman, which was classified as "restricted". It was only this shot which had made the video completely restricted.

== Promotion and release ==
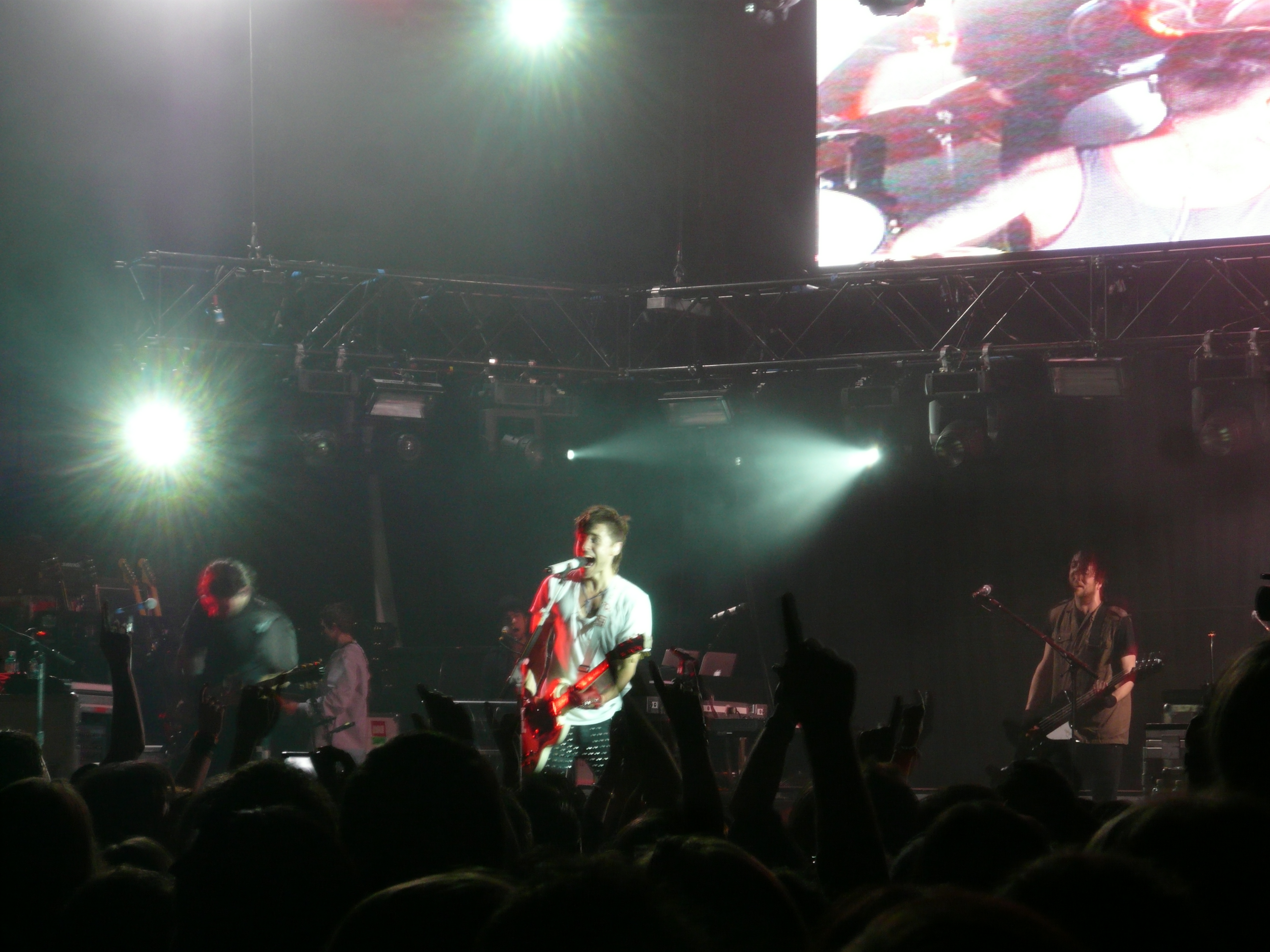
Thirty Seconds to Mars performing in Zürich, Switzerland in-support of This Is War.

BioWare has announced that the soundtrack of Dragon Age: Origins contains the song "This Is War", as the title track. The track made its world debut in the game before the release of the album. Steve Schnur, Worldwide Executive of Music and Music Marketing at Electronic Arts described working with Thirty Seconds to Mars:

"EA has always had a forward-thinking relationship with Thirty Seconds to Mars and we are overwhelmed with excitement about the band's involvement and creative contribution to Dragon Age: Origins. This exciting song debut exemplifies our continued commitment to working with great bands that move the needle to where music is going."

Jared Leto commented, "We always try to push the envelope both in the entertainment world and the media, and our title track to debut in a game of this caliber is one of the best ways to bring our music to fans around the world. We've come a long way from having to rely solely on radio to approach and engage music fans, and Dragon Age: Origins is the perfect game to do this with."

This Is War features 2,000 different album covers featuring individual photos of fans from around the world. The band asked fans to submit pictures of themselves, and then selected the 2,000 best images. The images were then used as covers for the album itself and shipped randomly to stores around the world.

Cobra Starship frontman Gabe Saporta revealed to MTV News that he is featured on one of the covers, after sending in a photo and not expecting to be selected. Leto's mother also features on a cover. There is also a number of other notable persons including manager Irving Azoff and label executives Ron Werre, Greg Thompson, Angelica Cob-Baehler, Colin Finklestein and Bob Semanovich; as well as celebrities Bam Margera, Kat Von D, Conan O'Brien and members of the bands Chevelle and Street Drum Corps.

The CD booklet, as well as the promotional and digital artwork features a roaring tiger. All retail albums include varied sleeves, separate from the booklet, featuring one of the 2,000 different covers.

== Reception ==
Professional ratings
Review scores
| Source | Rating |
|---|---|
| AllMusic | 3/5 stars |
| Alternative Press | 4/5 stars |
| Billboard | favorable |
| Entertainment Weekly | B− |
| Kerrang! | 4/5 stars |
| Los Angeles Times | 4/4 stars |
| Melodic | 4.5/5 stars |
| Q | 3/5 stars |
| Rock Sound | 9/10 |
| Spin | 3/10 |

=== Critical response ===
This Is War received mixed reviews from critics, with review aggregator Metacritic reporting an average score of 57 based on 12 reviews.

=== Chart performance ===
In the week of its release, This Is War sold over 67,000 units in the United States, entering the Billboard 200 at number 19. The album debuted at number two on the Billboard Alternative Albums chart, number two on the Digital Albums chart, number four on the Rock Albums chart, and number 23 on the European Albums chart. On August 19, 2011, the album was certified platinum by the British Phonographic Industry for shipping 300,000 units. On November 8, 2011, the album was certified gold in the United States.

The first single from the album, "Kings and Queens", debuted in its week of release at number 20 on the Billboard Alternative Songs chart and the number 24 on the Rock Songs chart. On the Alternative Songs chart, the song rose to the Top 5 only four weeks after its debut, peaking at number one and staying there for three weeks, ending Muse's song "Uprising"'s dominant run at the top of the chart. It is the second Alternative number one song from Thirty Seconds to Mars, with the first being "From Yesterday", which managed two weeks at the top. Before its release as a single, in the week ending December 26, 2009, the song "This Is War" debuted on the Billboard Hot 100 at number 72, number 67 on the Canadian Hot 100, number four on the Heatseekers Songs chart and number 33 on the Hot Digital Songs chart. The song was released as a single to American radio on March 8, 2010.

In Germany, the album debuted at number 15 and quickly fell, and after only 14 weeks it disappeared from the albums chart. After the album achieved several new entries at some low positions, it managed to climb up continuously since June (six months after the album's release) and after another 10 weeks, it reached its final peak of 12.

As of May 2012, This Is War had sold nearly four million albums and over one million singles worldwide.

== Accolades ==
Accolades for This Is War
| Publication | Country | Accolade | Year | Rank |
|---|---|---|---|---|
| AOL Music | United States | "Best Albums of 2009" | 2009 | * |
| Rock Sound | United Kingdom | "Best Album Artwork" | 2009 | 3 |
| Rock Sound | United Kingdom | "Best Album of 2009" | 2009 | 3 |
| Virgin Radio Italia | Italy | "Best Album of 2009" | 2009 | 1 |

== Track listing ==
All tracks are written by Jared Leto, except "L490" by Shannon Leto.

| No. | Title | Length |
|---|---|---|
| 1. | "Escape" | 2:24 |
| 2. | "Night of the Hunter" | 5:40 |
| 3. | "Kings and Queens" | 5:46 |
| 4. | "This Is War" | 5:27 |
| 5. | "100 Suns" | 1:58 |
| 6. | "Hurricane" | 6:12 |
| 7. | "Closer to the Edge" | 4:33 |
| 8. | "Vox Populi" | 5:43 |
| 9. | "Search and Destroy" | 5:39 |
| 10. | "Alibi" | 5:59 |
| 11. | "Stranger in a Strange Land" | 6:54 |
| 12. | "L490" | 4:27 |
| Total length: | | 60:40 |

iTunes Deluxe edition bonus tracks
| No. | Title | Length |
|---|---|---|
| 13. | "Kings and Queens" (LA Riots vocal mix) | 6:12 |
| 14. | "Night of the Hunter" (Flood remix) (Pre-order only) | 5:42 |
| Total length: | | 72:34 |

Japanese bonus tracks
| No. | Title | Length |
|---|---|---|
| 13. | "Kings and Queens" (Eddy and Tiborg radio mix) | 4:10 |
| 14. | "Kings and Queens" (Innerpartysystem remix main) | 6:17 |
| Total length: | | 71:07 |

Deluxe edition bonus tracks
| No. | Title | Writer(s) | Producer | Length |
|---|---|---|---|---|
| 13. | "Hurricane 2.0" (featuring Kanye West) | | | 6:11 |
| 14. | "Bad Romance" (BBC live version) | Stefani Germanotta, Nadir Khayat | Simon Askew | 4:40 |
| 15. | "Stronger" (BBC live version) | Kanye West, Thomas Bangalter, Guy-Manuel de Homem-Christo, Edwin Birdsong | Andy Rogers | 6:03 |
| Total length: | | | | 77:30 |

Deluxe edition DVD
| No. | Title | Length |
|---|---|---|
| 1. | "Closer to the Edge" (Music video) | 6:22 |
| 2. | "The Ride (Kings and Queens)" (Music video) | 8:51 |
| 3. | "The Ride" (The Making of) | 20:48 |
| 4. | "Into the Wild" | 6:15 |
| 5. | "The Summit" | 3:12 |
| 6. | "War Is Coming" (Short films) | 7:16 |
| Total length: | | 52:44 |

== Personnel ==
Thirty Seconds to Mars

- Jared Leto – vocals, guitars, bass guitar, keyboards, synths
- Shannon Leto – drums, percussion; guitar (on "L490")
- Tomo Miličević – guitars, bass guitar, keyboards, synths, violin, programming, percussion

Visuals and imagery

- Mark Thecobrasnake – photography
- Varnish Studio Inc – art direction
- Jared Leto – art direction

Technical and production

- Flood – production, co-production on "Kings and Queens", "Closer to the Edge", "Vox Populi"
- Thirty Seconds to Mars – production, co-production on "Kings and Queens", "Closer to the Edge", "Vox Populi", mixing on "L490"
- Steve Lillywhite – co-production on "Kings and Queens", "Closer to the Edge", "Vox Populi"
- Ryan Williams – engineering, mixing
- Brian Virtue – engineering on "Night of the Hunter", "Search and Destroy", mixing on "Stranger in a Strange Land"
- Tom Biller – additional engineering on "Night of the Hunter", "Kings and Queens", "100 Suns", "Hurricane", "Alibi"
- Rob Kirwan – additional engineering on "Kings and Queens", "This Is War", "Vox Populi"
- Dana Nielsen – additional engineering on "Night of the Hunter", "Stranger in a Strange Land"
- Matt Radosevich – additional engineering on "This Is War", "Search and Destroy", "Closer to the Edge"
- Jamie Schefman – additional engineering
- Sonny Diperri – additional engineering
- Andre Doucette – pre-production engineering
- Joe Wohlmut – additional Los Angeles Summit engineering
- Cenzo Townshend – mixing on "Hurricane"
- Neil Comber – mixing assistant on "Hurricane"
- Mike Shipley – mixing on "Search and Destroy"
- Brian Wholgemuth – mixing assistant on "Search and Destroy"
- Stephen Marcussen – mastering
- Evren Göknar – mastering on "Bad Romance" (BBC live version), "Stronger" (BBC live version)

Managerial

- Front Line management – management
- King, Holmes, Paterno & Berliner – legal representation
- Wasserman, Grossman and Sloan – business management
- CAA – booking agent

== Charts ==
=== Weekly charts ===
Weekly chart performance for This Is War
| Chart (2009–11) | Peak position |
|---|---|
| Australian Albums (ARIA) | 18 |
| Austrian Albums (Ö3 Austria) | 8 |
| Belgian Albums (Ultratop Flanders) | 74 |
| Belgian Albums (Ultratop Wallonia) | 34 |
| Czech Albums (ČNS IFPI) | 35 |
| Dutch Albums (Album Top 100) | 31 |
| Estonian Albums (ERR) | 5 |
| European Albums (Billboard) | 16 |
| Finnish Albums (Suomen virallinen lista) | 19 |
| French Albums (SNEP) | 96 |
| German Albums (Offizielle Top 100) | 12 |
| Greek Albums (IFPI) | 44 |
| Irish Albums (IRMA) | 51 |
| Italian Albums (FIMI) | 19 |
| Mexican Albums (Top 100 Mexico) | 39 |
| New Zealand Albums (RMNZ) | 9 |
| Polish Albums (ZPAV) | 34 |
| Portuguese Albums (AFP) | 6 |
| Russian Albums (TopHit) | 12 |
| Scottish Albums (Official Charts) | 13 |
| Spanish Albums (Promusicae) | 52 |
| Swiss Albums (Schweizer Hitparade) | 20 |
| UK Albums (Official Charts) | 15 |
| US Billboard 200 | 19 |
| US Top Alternative Albums (Billboard) | 2 |
| US Top Rock Albums (Billboard) | 4 |

=== Year-end charts ===
Year-end chart performance for This Is War
| Chart (2010) | Position |
|---|---|
| Australian Albums (ARIA) | 87 |
| Austrian Albums (Ö3 Austria) | 28 |
| German Albums (Offizielle Top 100) | 47 |
| UK Albums (OCC) | 72 |
| US Billboard 200 | 116 |
| US Top Rock Albums (Billboard) | 38 |

== Certifications ==
Certifications and sales for This Is War
| Region | Certification | Certified units/sales |
|---|---|---|
| Australia (ARIA) | Gold | 35,000^{^} |
| Austria (IFPI Austria) | Gold | 10,000^{*} |
| Belgium (BRMA) | 2× Platinum | 60,000^{*} |
| Germany (BVMI) | Platinum | 200,000^{^} |
| Ireland (IRMA) | Gold | 7,500^{^} |
| Italy (FIMI) | Gold | 30,000^{*} |
| New Zealand (RMNZ) | Gold | 7,500^{‡} |
| Poland (ZPAV) | Platinum | 20,000^{*} |
| Portugal (AFP) | 2× Platinum | 40,000^{^} |
| South Africa (RISA) | Gold | 20,000^{*} |
| United Kingdom (BPI) | Platinum | 300,000^{^} |
| United States (RIAA) | Gold | 500,000^{^} |
^{*} Sales figures based on certification alone.^{^} Shipments figures based on certification alone.^{‡} Sales+streaming figures based on certification alone.

== Release history ==
Release dates and formats for This Is War
| Region | Date | Distributing label | Format |
|---|---|---|---|
| Australia | December 4, 2009 | EMI Music | CD |
| Austria | December 4, 2009 | EMI Music | CD |
| Finland | December 4, 2009 | EMI Music | CD |
| Germany | December 4, 2009 | EMI Music | CD |
| Italy | December 4, 2009 | EMI/Virgin | CD |
| Switzerland | December 4, 2009 | EMI Music | CD |
| Denmark | December 7, 2009 | EMI Music | CD |
| New Zealand | December 7, 2009 | EMI Music | CD |
| Norway | December 7, 2009 | EMI Music | CD |
| Poland | December 7, 2009 | EMI Music | CD |
| United Kingdom | December 7, 2009 | EMI/Virgin | CD |
| Argentina | December 8, 2009 | EMI Music | CD |
| Canada | December 8, 2009 | Virgin | CD |
| Mexico | December 8, 2009 | EMI Music | CD |
| Spain | December 8, 2009 | EMI Music | CD |
| United States | December 8, 2009 | Virgin | CD |
| South Africa | December 8, 2009 | EMI/Virgin | CD |
| Brazil | December 10, 2009 | EMI Music | CD |
| Japan | July 14, 2010 | Toshiba EMI | CD |
Deluxe edition
| United States | November 9, 2010 | Virgin | CD+DVD |
| Australia | November 19, 2010 | EMI Music | CD+DVD |
| Poland | November 22, 2010 | EMI Music | CD+DVD |
| Brazil | November 30, 2010 | EMI Music | CD+DVD |
