= This Is War (Thirty Seconds to Mars song) =

Single by Thirty Seconds to Mars

from the album This Is War
- Released: March 26, 2010
- Recorded: 2008–2009; The International Centre for the Advancement of the Arts and Sciences of Sound; (Los Angeles, California)
- Genre: Alternative rock; progressive rock
- Length: 5:27
- Label: Virgin; EMI
- Songwriter: Jared Leto
- Producers: Flood; Thirty Seconds to Mars

Thirty Seconds to Mars singles chronology
"Kings and Queens" (2009)	"This Is War" (2010)	"Closer to the Edge" (2010)

Music video
- "This Is War" on YouTube

"This Is War" is a song by American rock band Thirty Seconds to Mars, featured on their third studio album This Is War (2009). Written by lead vocalist Jared Leto, the song was released as the second single from the album to American radio on March 8, 2010, and the physical single was released on March 26, 2010.

== Music video ==
The music video was shot on April 7, 2010. A 30-second teaser was released and the music video was set to premiere in June 2010. However, it was delayed. The film features 30 Seconds to Mars as US Marines deployed to Afghanistan. The video was supposedly leaked on April 1, 2011. In response to the leak, the band stated that they would release the full-length video soon. On April 6, 2011, nearly a year after the video was shot, it was finally released. It shows the band dressed up as American Marines patrolling the desert in an armored Humvee while showing scenes of war and leaders all while some unknown entity observes them and their actions. Near the end of the video, various military vehicles (Humvees, tanks, fighter airplanes, helicopters, battleships) are flying seemingly uncontrollably above the men, toward a pile. The group's own Humvee gets sucked into the pile. The objects smashing into the pile get temporarily crushed but assume their normal un-crushed form after a second. As the camera shows the forming pile from afar, it is revealed that it forms a huge pyramid, hovering over the desert. The video was directed by Edouard Salier. It won the Video of the Year Award on MSN Latinoamérica.

== Track listing ==
All songs written by Jared Leto.

Promo (February 1, 2010)

1. "This Is War" (album version) – 5:27

EU CD single (March 26, 2010)

1. "This Is War" (album version) – 5:27
2. "Hurricane" (LA Mix) By Emma Ford and Natalie Loren aka "Luxury Kills" – 5:49

Digital download EP

1. "This Is War" (Album Version) – 5:47
2. "This Is War" (Radio Edit) – 4:46
3. "Night of the Hunter" (Static Revenger Redux) – 4:57

== In popular culture ==
- The song has been included on the soundtrack of Dragon Age: Origins, as downloadable content for Rock Band, the Formula One video review of the 2010 Italian Grand Prix and in a promo for the TV shows Camelot and Revolution.
- "This Is War" was used as the theme song for the first season of the fan-made abridged parody series Sword Art Online Abridged by Something Witty Entertainment.

== Charts ==
=== Weekly charts ===
Chart (2009–2010)	Peak position
Austria (Ö3 Austria Top 40)	73
Canada (Canadian Hot 100)	67
Germany (GfK)	79
Mexico Ingles Airplay (Billboard)	49
Netherlands (Dutch Top 40)	52
Scotland Singles (OCC)	43
UK Singles (OCC)	51
UK Airplay (Music Week)	24
US Billboard Hot 100	72
US Hot Rock & Alternative Songs (Billboard)	4
US Rock Airplay (Billboard)	4
US Mainstream Rock (Billboard)	30
US Alternative Airplay (Billboard)	1

=== Year-end charts ===
Chart (2010)	Position
US Hot Rock & Alternative Songs (Billboard)	22
US Alternative Airplay (Billboard)	10

== Certifications ==
Region	Certification	Certified units/sales
Brazil (Pro-Música Brasil)	Gold	30,000^{‡}
New Zealand (RMNZ)	Gold	15,000^{‡}
United Kingdom (BPI)	Silver	200,000^{‡}
United States (RIAA)	Gold	500,000^{‡}
^{‡} Sales+streaming figures based on certification alone.

== Release history ==
Region	Date	Label
Austria	March 26, 2010	EMI
Italy	March 26, 2010	EMI; Virgin
Germany	March 26, 2010	EMI
Switzerland	March 26, 2010	EMI
United Kingdom	March 28, 2010	EMI; Virgin
United States	March 28, 2010	EMI; Virgin

== See also ==
- List of Billboard Alternative Songs number ones of the 2010
