= Kings and Queens (Thirty Seconds to Mars song) =

Single by Thirty Seconds to Mars

from the album This Is War
- Released: October 13, 2009
- Studio: The International Centre for the Advancement of the Arts and Sciences of Sound, Los Angeles, California
- Genre: Alternative rock; progressive rock
- Length: 5:50
- Label: Virgin; EMI
- Songwriter: Jared Leto
- Producers: Flood; Steve Lillywhite; Thirty Seconds to Mars

Thirty Seconds to Mars singles chronology
"A Beautiful Lie" (2007)	"Kings and Queens" (2009)	"This Is War" (2010)

Music video
- "Kings and Queens" on YouTube

"Kings and Queens" is a song by American rock band Thirty Seconds to Mars, featured on their third studio album This Is War (2009). Written by lead vocalist Jared Leto across the United States and South Africa, the track was produced by Flood, Steve Lillywhite and Thirty Seconds to Mars. According to Leto, the lyrics of "Kings and Queens" explore the triumphant feeling of human possibilities. The melody of the song contains several qualities similar to that of 1980s adult contemporary musical works and is imbued with elements of progressive rock. The song was released as the lead single from This Is War on October 13, 2009.

"Kings and Queens" received critical acclaim, with critics deeming it as an album highlight. Much of the praise went to the song's lyrics and the musical production; reviewers also complimented Leto's vocals. The song became the band's second number one single on the US Alternative Songs chart and attained moderate success in international markets. The accompanying music video, directed by Jared Leto, features Thirty Seconds to Mars and a group of followers on a Critical Mass movement through Los Angeles at night. Critics lauded the simplicity of the video, which was nominated for numerous accolades, including four awards at the 2010 MTV Video Music Awards.

Thirty Seconds to Mars performed the song on The Tonight Show with Conan O'Brien featuring the Street Drum Corps, and included it on the setlist of the Into the Wild Tour. The song was also performed on the band's Love, Lust, Faith and Dreams Tour, as well as the Carnivores Tour.

== Background ==
"Kings and Queens" was written by Jared Leto and produced by Flood, Steve Lillywhite and Thirty Seconds to Mars. The song was recorded by Ryan Williams and Matt Radosevich at The International Centre for the Advancement of the Arts and Sciences of Sound in Los Angeles, California. It premiered on Kevin and Bean's radio show of KROQ in Los Angeles on October 6, 2009. Leto constructed the lyrics of "Kings and Queens" across two different continents; the idea was conceived on a flight from the United States and realised upon touchdown in South Africa. He further elaborated on the writing process in an interview with MusicRadar:

In many ways, a cornerstone for this record. Half of [the song] was written in America and the other half was written in South Africa, which has proved to be a very lucky and magical place for the band. I wrote the first verse just as I was headed out the door for South Africa, and the minute I touched down I finished the rest of it. I took that as a good omen. Musically, it was a bit of a beast in that it was originally eight minutes long, so we had to do some trimming. I decided to change the chord structure of the bridge and just let the pieces fall where they may. Steve Lillywhite really helped out with that, figuring out what made sense.

In early 2009, Leto told Billboard that he was excited by the song as soon as he wrote it. He said, "I had written a verse right as we were going to the airport—I literally almost missed the flight because I picked up the guitar and this song came out. You have that moment of discovery that's exciting."

== Composition ==
"Kings and Queens"
A 30-second sample of "Kings and Queens" where the chorus is played, featuring guitars influenced by arena rock.

"Kings and Queens" is an alternative rock song with influences and elements from progressive rock and arena rock. It opens with a wild hawk scream recorded live over the band's work space, then transitioning into an ambient introduction. The song includes a heavy contribution from the band's fans, captured singing a chorus created from layers of the band's Summit recordings. According to the sheet music published at Musicnotes.com by Universal Music Publishing Group, "Kings and Queens" is written in the time signature of common time, with a moderate metronome of 82 beats per minute. It is composed in the key of E♭ major and the melody spans the tonal range of B♭_{3} to B♭_{5}.

Jared Leto explained that the title and theme of the track were inspired by a book found at the band's South African work space, but that it "ended up being a good metaphor" for world events from the past year. He further said that the lyrics feature "a triumphant feeling of the possibilities that we all have." Kelly Staskel of Billboard felt that "stately drums and dramatic strings" are paired with lyrics that take on a "stark, apocalyptic tone", referring to the last verse of the song, which says "The age of man is over / A darkness comes and all / These lessons that we learned here / Have only just begun". Ryan Jones of Alternative Addiction noticed the 1980s influences that resonated throughout the track and compared its melody to the sound of U2.

Alex Useman of The Husky Herald described the song saying, "'Kings and Queens' starts out with a soft piano melody and instantly picks up as the drum kicks in. The intensity of the song subsides as Jared Leto's voice enters sings the verse and once the chorus hits, the entire band explodes into a beautiful assortment of instrumentation, choric background vocals, and Leto's soaring voice. When the bridge begins, the storm of the song seems to subside and what is left is Leto's voice ringing out "The age of man is over [...] Have only just begun" and through the bridge, there is an intense build up which leads into the final chorus."

== Critical reception ==
"Kings and Queens" was met with general acclaim from music critics. Kelly Staskel from Billboard commented, "Grounded by Leto's convincing vocals, 'Kings and Queens' is epic rock at its most affecting." She praised the song saying, "a chorus chants behind singer Jared Leto's smooth, powerful voice, evoking the collective thrill of a live show." Victoria Durham from Rock Sound acknowledged the influences of U2 and called the song "epic and euphoric". Andrew Ellis from Melodic magazine felt that the song features all the elements of the band's previous single "From Yesterday" mixed with higher vocal patterns and a "great sing along chorus". Stephen Thomas Erlewine from AllMusic praised the track as one of the album's highlights. Tim Grierson from About.com was impressed with the song and opined that Thirty Seconds to Mars wants to inspire the listener with "arena-ready anthems" like "Kings and Queens", which he called a "grand sing-along song" that has a "populist feel".

Jon Bye, writing for Gigwise, felt that the track is "full on epic space rock, almost certainly designed with stadium in mind". He called it "highly affirming and uplifting", while pointing out the influences of U2. Alex Lai from Contactmusic gave the song a positive review, noticing that it opens up with a "tidal wave of 'woah' vocals, galloping strings" and features a chorus to "shake the foundations of the arenas". He also felt that Jared Leto is as "impassioned" in his vocal delivery as ever. At the end of 2009, Rock Sound listed "Kings and Queens" as the best song of the year. AOL Radio placed the track at number one on the Top Alternative Songs of 2010, with critic Sara Anderson saying, "if ever there were an arena-ready song, this would be it." Furthermore, Alternative Addiction ranked the song at number 30 on its list of the 50 Best Songs of 2009.

== Music video ==
=== Development ===
The music video for "Kings and Queens" was directed by Jared Leto under the pseudonym of Bartholomew Cubbins. It was shot the weekend of October 11–13, 2009 in Los Angeles over the course of several nights, filming some of the city's most iconic landmarks. Leto explained, "I think this city is a beautiful place at night, and we have these empty streets, and it's kind of a haunting, forgotten landscape... very serene." The crew recruited scores of extras and all manner of surrealist street performers to appear in the video. On October 11, 2009, Thirty Seconds to Mars shut down Santa Monica Pier and filmed a segment of the short film along with a group of cyclists. Leto got the inspiration behind the video after some of his friends did Critical Mass and Crank Mob, "groups of riders that get together and kind of reclaim public spaces and take over the streets in several cities around America," and he thought that it would be the perfect backdrop for the music video of "Kings and Queens".

During the shooting, the crew had some problems in filming some scenes. Leto told MTV News, "It's been an incredible adventure, but it's also been really difficult, because there are so many people, and we're shutting down streets of Los Angeles." He further said that they were really worried about a scene regarding a lone horse running down a Los Angeles street: "We only had three takes that we had time to do. The first take it went sideways, second take it went the other way. Third take? Perfect." Leto described the experience of filming the music video saying, "It's a lyrical and slightly metaphorical surreal journey through the city of Angels, from downtown Los Angeles to Santa Monica Pier. We like to create an adventure and this has been an adventure. [...] This is what we were supposed to do. And I doubted the idea up until the very last minute, but the process has been phenomenal." The music video premiered on November 9, 2009 at the Montalban Theater in Los Angeles.

=== Concept ===
Banksy's reference seen throughout the music video, which featured several allusions to different art forms.

The music video features a Critical Mass crank mob movement, founded with forward-thinking and eco-conscious intentions, on a nighttime journey from downtown Los Angeles to Santa Monica Pier. A different theme of the video simply features the band playing on a cliff edge in Griffith Park overlooking the city. These two themes alternate between each other during the course of the video. "Kings and Queens" begins with a framed silhouette shot of dozens of cyclists moving in slow motion, backed by a sunset. From the scenic view of the city's skyline, the cast, crew and other members wrapped up and headed to downtown Los Angeles for scenes involving a horse and a fire thrower, among others.

"Kings and Queens" is filled with references to other art forms. Some of the cyclists are dressed as the Baseball Furies gang from the 1979 film The Warriors, and at one point a frame meticulously recreates underground artist Banksy's Flower Chucker graffiti. In the video also appears a horse running down a deserted city street in slow motion, which was described as a surreal and fantastic vision of downtown Los Angeles. As "Kings and Queens" comes to a close, the group of cyclists make their way onto Santa Monica Pier as the sun rises. The band's song "Stranger in a Strange Land" is played during the credits for the full music video.

=== Reception ===
Upon its release, the video received universal acclaim from contemporary music critics. James Montgomery from MTV felt that the video "is most definitely a massive thing, but it's a spiritual endeavor, too: a celebration of a band, their fans and an unyielding sense of purpose". He further commented, "the message, it seems, is clear: There is might in masses, a freedom in unity and strength in conviction. And all it takes to harness any of it is will." Montgomery also noticed that although the band's previous videos were more elaborate, "Kings and Queens" was "no less of an epic undertaking". Joe Bosso of MusicRadar was impressed by the video and felt that "the beautifully shot clip" is a "reverent nod" to directors Akira Kurosawa and Walter Hill. He noted that its production values "haven't been seen in music videos for quite some time". August Brown from the Los Angeles Times opined that with "raging wildfires and white stallion" that joins them, Thirty Seconds to Mars "hasn't lost its taste for the epic". Tim Grierson from About.com felt that Los Angeles is featured in all its glory in the music video for "Kings and Queens". Kyle Anderson from MTV believed that although the premise and approach of the music video is "relatively simple" and does not feature special effects, it is "actually an incredibly cinematic, wholly satisfying experience". In 2013, Kerrang! magazine included "Kings and Queens" among the best music videos by Thirty Seconds to Mars, noting that "the band never shy away from a challenge, making full use of frontman Jared Leto's Hollywood experience and delivering huge, concept-based short films."

In December 2009, "Kings and Queens" was voted the best video of the year by readers of Rock Sound. On August 3, 2010, the video received four nominations at the 2010 MTV Video Music Awards in the categories of Best Art Direction, Best Direction, Best Rock Video, and Video of the Year. It went on to win Best Rock Video. At the 2010 MTV Europe Music Awards, it was nominated for Best Video. It also received nominations at the Fuse Awards and the Kerrang! Awards, winning Best Video at the 2009 Rock on Request Awards.

== Live performances ==
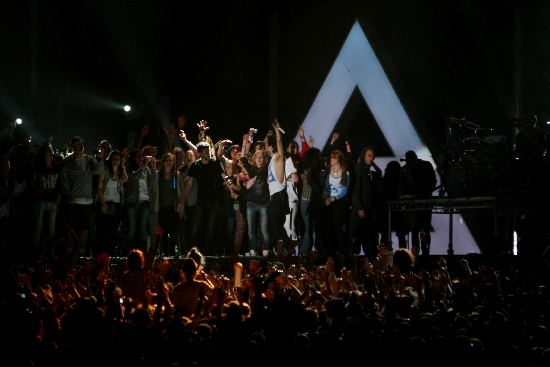
Thirty Seconds to Mars performing "Kings and Queens" during the Into the Wild Tour in July 2011

On December 10, 2009, Thirty Seconds to Mars performed "Kings and Queens" on The Tonight Show with Conan O'Brien featuring the Street Drum Corps, a string quartet and ten-person choir. "Kings and Queens" was performed as the last song of band's Into the Wild Tour. Throughout the tour, Jared Leto would choose audience members to join the band on stage for the song. "Kings and Queens" was played during the Tribus Centum Numerarae, the 300th show of the tour, which garnered the band the Guinness World Record for most live shows during a single album cycle. The show took place on December 7, 2011 at the Hammerstein Ballroom in New York City and was broadcast worldwide on the internet. At the 2012 O Music Awards in June, it was awarded Best Online Concert Experience.

On May 13, 2011, Thirty Seconds to Mars recorded a performance for the television program MTV Unplugged during which they played an acoustic version of "Kings and Queens" featuring musicians from the Vitamin String Quartet. The song was included on the setlist of the band's Love, Lust, Faith and Dreams Tour and was performed both in the original and acoustic version. It was also performed on the Carnivores Tour, a tour on which Thirty Seconds to Mars co-headlined with Linkin Park.

== Cover versions and media usage ==
The Tufts Beelzebubs performed an a cappella version of "Kings and Queens" during their Spring Show on March 5, 2010, which was later released on their 2011 album, Battle. At the 2012 Contemporary A Cappella Recording Awards on April 5, the cover version won Best Male Collegiate Song and received a nomination for Best Male Collegiate Arrangement for Alexander Koutzoukis. "Kings and Queens" was featured in films such as Skyline (2010) and Two Rabbits (2012). It can also be heard in the trailers for Legend of the Guardians: The Owls of Ga'Hoole, Hugo, and How to Train Your Dragon 2. In 2013, the song was used in the episode "The Savage Edge" of the television series North America. "Kings and Queens" is available as downloadable content for the music video game series Guitar Hero and Rock Band. On June 24, 2014, the London Philharmonic Orchestra premiered a cover version of the song on Vimeo. In March 2015, British band You Me at Six covered "Kings and Queens" for Rock Sound magazine. The cover version appeared on the compilation Worship and Tributes (2015), released for the 200th issue of the magazine. ESPN has used the song and cover versions of it in their tennis coverage. In the 2018 episode "Ask the Dust" (S04E01) of the TV series Bosch, a parade of cyclists ride by at night with flashing headlighted tall bicycles just as seen in the music video. During the 2022-2023 NFL Season, FOX Sports used the song prior to commercial breaks.

== Track listing ==
Digital download

1. "Kings and Queens" – 5:47

Digital download EP

1. "Kings and Queens" – 5:47
2. "Night of the Hunter" (Static Revenger Rock Redux) – 4:57
3. "Kings and Queens" (Innerpartysystem Remix Main) – 6:14

Promo CD single

1. "Kings and Queens" (Radio Edit) – 5:08
2. "Kings and Queens" (Album Version) – 5:47

EU CD single

1. "Kings and Queens" (Album Version) – 5:47
2. "Kings and Queens" (Radio Edit) – 5:05

UK 7" vinyl single

1. "Kings and Queens" (Radio Edit) – 5:05
2. "Night of the Hunter" (Static Revenger Remix) – 4:58

UK 7" vinyl single

1. "Kings and Queens" – 5:47

== Credits and personnel ==
- Performed by Thirty Seconds to Mars
- Written by Jared Leto
- Produced by Flood, Steve Lillywhite, and Thirty Seconds to Mars
- Recorded by Ryan Williams and Matt Radosevich at The International Centre for the Advancement of the Arts and Sciences of Sound, Los Angeles, California
- Audio engineering by Ryan Williams
- Additional engineering by Tom Biller, Rob Kirwan, Jamie Schefman, and Sonny Diperri
- Mixed by Ryan Williams at Pulse Recording Studios, Los Angeles, California
- Additional strings orchestrated and recorded by Michael Einziger at Harvard University, Cambridge, Massachusetts
- Mastered by Stephen Marcussen at Marcussen Mastering, Hollywood, California

Credits adapted from This Is War album liner notes.

== Charts ==
=== Weekly charts ===
Chart (2009–10)	Peak position
Australia (ARIA)	67
Austria (Ö3 Austria Top 40)	35
Belgium (Ultratip Bubbling Under Flanders)	15
Canada (Canadian Hot 100)	70
Canada Rock (Billboard)	11
Czech Republic (IFPI)	58
Czech Republic Rock (IFPI)	1
Europe (Billboard)	52
Germany (GfK)	39
Mexico Ingles Airplay (Billboard)	3
Netherlands (Dutch Top 40)	21
New Zealand (Recorded Music NZ)	14
Portugal (AFP)	9
Scotland Singles (OCC)	19
UK Singles (OCC)	28
UK Airplay (Music Week)	39
US Billboard Hot 100	82
US Hot Rock & Alternative Songs (Billboard)	4
US Mainstream Rock (Billboard)	20
US Alternative Airplay (Billboard)	1

=== Year-end charts ===
Chart (2010)	Position
UK Singles (OCC)	177
US Alternative Songs (Billboard)	11
US Rock Songs (Billboard)	16

== Certifications ==
Region	Certification	Certified units/sales
Brazil (Pro-Música Brasil)	Gold	30,000^{‡}
New Zealand (RMNZ)	Platinum	30,000^{‡}
United Kingdom (BPI)	Gold	400,000^{‡}
^{‡} Sales+streaming figures based on certification alone.

== See also ==
- List of Billboard number-one alternative singles of the 2010s
