= Hurricane (Thirty Seconds to Mars song) =

2009 song by Thirty Seconds to Mars

Promotional single by Thirty Seconds to Mars

from the album This Is War
- Released: December 4, 2009
- Recorded: 2008–2009; The International Centre for the Advancement of the Arts and Sciences of Sound, Los Angeles, California
- Genre: Space rock; symphonic rock
- Length: 6:12
- Label: Virgin; EMI
- Songwriter: Jared Leto
- Producers: Flood; Thirty Seconds to Mars

Music video
- "Hurricane" on YouTube

"Hurricane" is a song written by American rock band Thirty Seconds to Mars that is featured on their third studio album, This Is War (2009). The song was written by lead vocalist and songwriter Jared Leto and produced by Leto, Flood and Steve Lilywhite. There are two versions of this song, one of which is included on the album and another which is a collaboration with rapper Kanye West, titled "Hurricane 2.0". "Hurricane" was awarded Best Single at the Kerrang! Awards 2011. The thirteen-minute music video, directed by Leto under the pseudonym Bartholomew Cubbins, garnered controversy when it premiered on November 29, 2010. It was banned by MTV because of its sexual content. An edited version, however, was put on heavy rotation on MTV2.

== Background and recording ==
Leto wrote the piano ballad "Hurricane" in winter 2007 whilst in Berlin. In an interview, Jared said the following about the song:

"I wrote 'Hurricane' in Berlin in the winter in 2007. It was winter, it was getting dark at like 3:30 in the afternoon, and it could go either way. It could be incredibly comforting or incredibly depressing. Thankfully, it was a little bit of both. It was inspiring nonetheless."

— Jared Leto

== Music video ==
The video, which runs for 13 minutes and 10 seconds and was directed by Leto under the pseudonym Bartholomew Cubbins, premiered on MTV on November 29, 2010.

The experimental short film is 12 minutes long and contains excerpts from the tracks "Escape" and "Night of the Hunter." It takes place in what is believed to be a dream, and explores a violent and sexual world where 30 Seconds to Mars are stalked and attacked by various figures known as "The Gimps", while a bisexual female couple known as Shae and Sunisa engage in sexual bondage activities with Jared while he is confronted by hallucinations. Jared spends the entire video shirtless and being chased by a sledgehammer-wielding killer obsessed with trying to kill him. Shannon battles with a woman, who shares romantic feelings for him, ending with a kiss. Tomo, who liberates a woman from her abuser (who is also Jared's stalker), receives a key as a gift. He composes the orchestral score of the song with three identical copies of himself.

=== Controversy ===
The music video for the song was banned by MTV and several other TV channels around the world. The video was censored and banned because of its elements of violence, nudity, and sex in an almost pornographic context. On November 28, 2010, Jared Leto posted a letter from an unnamed network about the censorship of the video on his blog. The list features the offending scenes, such as a woman running her finger on the anus of another G-string clad woman, which was classified as "restricted". Another offensive scene is the Rabbi, Priest, and Monk burning religious books. It was these two shots which had made the video completely restricted. The video is still available online with a viewing certificate of 18+. The video uses the version of the song without Kanye West, hence West does not make an appearance in the video.

== Hurricane 2.0 ==
"Hurricane 2.0"

Single by Thirty Seconds to Mars featuring Kanye West

from the album This Is War (Deluxe version)
- Released: November 15, 2010
- Recorded: 2009; The International Centre for the Advancement of the Arts and Sciences of Sound; (Los Angeles, California)
- Genre: Space rock; symphonic rock
- Length: 6:12 (album version)
- Label: Virgin; EMI
- Songwriter: Jared Leto
- Producers: Flood; Thirty Seconds to Mars

Thirty Seconds to Mars singles chronology
"Closer to the Edge" (2010)	"Hurricane 2.0" (2010)	"Up in the Air" (2013)

Kanye West singles chronology
"Start It Up" (2010)	"Hurricane 2.0" (2010)	"All of the Lights" (2010)

"Hurricane 2.0" is a song written by American rock band Thirty Seconds to Mars that is featured on their third studio album, This Is War (deluxe version), which was released as the fourth single from the album in November 2010. The song, produced by Flood and Thirty Seconds to Mars, features vocals from American rapper Kanye West. This version only appears on the deluxe version. The latter has a variation in certain parts of the track.

=== Background and recording ===
During May 2009, Kanye West posted a photo of himself, Brandon Flowers (the frontman of The Killers), and Jared Leto together and announced that he and Leto were working together on a song named "Hurricane". This collaboration was only included on an early version of "Hurricane", and West's work did not make it onto the album. Leto said that he,

"...had actually brought up [the idea of working with West] some time ago, but it's pretty unbelievable that it actually happened. [...] He came by here, he was here in the studio, and we did some initial kind of listening, and he did some singing, and we knew we needed to kind of follow up and finish things, so I went over to Hawaii [with] an engineer and a small crew, and we had a great time."

— Jared Leto

West's vocal contribution to the song was ultimately removed because of legal issues surrounding the rights of each record company. Although it was not released on the original pressing of the album, Leto has said the track will be heard eventually. The early leaked versions of the album had the version of "Hurricane" featuring Kanye West included. The deluxe version of This Is War included this version of the song as its first bonus track, retitled "Hurricane 2.0".

=== Charts ===
Chart (2010–11)	Peak position
Australia (ARIA)	67
Germany (Official German Charts)	45
Lebanon (The Official Lebanese Top 20)	15
Portugal (AFP)	27
South Africa (RISA)	7
UK Singles (OCC)	193
UK Rock & Metal (OCC)	4
