= Closer to the Edge =

Single by Thirty Seconds to Mars

from the album This Is War
- Released: August 20, 2010
- Recorded: 2008–2009
- Studio: The International Centre for the Advancement of the Arts and Sciences of Sound (Los Angeles)
- Genre: Progressive rock
- Length: 4:15 (radio edit); 4:34 (album version)
- Label: Virgin; EMI
- Songwriter: Jared Leto
- Producers: Flood; Thirty Seconds to Mars

Thirty Seconds to Mars singles chronology
"This Is War" (2010)	"Closer to the Edge" (2010)	"Hurricane 2.0" (2010)

Music video
- "Closer to the Edge" on YouTube

"Closer to the Edge" is a song written by Jared Leto and performed by American rock band Thirty Seconds to Mars. Produced by the band, co-produced by Flood, the track is the seventh track and the third single from their third studio album, This Is War (2009). It was released in the US on August 20, 2010.

== Background ==
Tomo Miličević, the former lead guitarist of 30 Seconds to Mars, said about the song, "A really interesting track. We call it our 'pop' song, but when you really listen to it, you realize that it has a lot of rock glory in it. It's a song that fools you, and I like that. Jared really pushed himself as a songwriter here in that he was trying to reach for a new way of presenting music that was very accessible but not spoon-fed it to the audience. He has a lot of respect for the fans in that way. The guy's a trip - very inspiring to be around and work with."

== Music video ==
The music video premiered on June 9, 2010, on the band's YouTube account. The video was directed by Jared Leto as "Bartholomew Cubbins". The video contains concert footage from about 30 performances during their Into the Wild Tour, which commenced on February 19, 2010, and ran till December 18, 2010. The six-minute-long video shows each location played at until a certain date, fan commentary and some backstage footage. "Closer to the Edge" is not the band's first live video, being preceded by "Edge of the Earth".

=== Critical reception ===
The video was received with highly positive reviews by critics. Australia's RadarRadio referred to the video as "epic". UK rock music website RockLouder also called the video "lovely" and "worth the watch".

== Commercial performance ==
"Closer to the Edge" debuted on the UK Singles Chart on July 11, 2010, at number 90 before climbing to number 82 the following week. On July 18, 2010, the single rose a further four places to number 78. The single also found success on the UK Rock & Metal Singles Chart, where it climbed until peaking at number 1 on July 11, 2010, knocking The Pretty Reckless' "Make Me Wanna Die" off its seven-week reign. The single also peaked at number 88 on the Dutch Single Top 100. It is also their highest charted single in Australia, peaking at number 13, becoming platinum. It debuted at number 99 on the Billboard Hot 100 on the chart dated May 21, 2011, more than two months after it dropped off of the Rock Songs and Alternative Songs charts. The song impacted radio on August 31, 2010. It became the band's first single to be played on adult contemporary radio, with the first stations added being Detroit's WNIC (which changed formats to adult top 40 in August 2011) during Spring 2011 and WLER-FM in Butler/Pittsburgh.

== Track listings ==
All tracks are written by Jared Leto.

CD single
No.	Title	Length
1.	"Closer to the Edge" (radio edit)	4:13
2.	"Closer to the Edge" (album version)	4:32
Total length:		8:45

== Charts ==
=== Weekly charts ===
Chart (2010–11)	Peak position
Australia (ARIA)	13
Austria (Ö3 Austria Top 40)	20
Belgium (Ultratip Bubbling Under Flanders)	21
Finland Airplay (Suomen virallinen lista)	15
Germany (GfK)	26
Mexico Ingles Airplay (Billboard)	48
Netherlands (Single Top 100)	88
New Zealand (Recorded Music NZ)	21
Scotland (OCC)	37
Slovakia Airplay (ČNS IFPI)	79
Switzerland (Schweizer Hitparade)	61
UK Singles (OCC)	44
UK Airplay (Music Week)	34
UK Rock & Metal (OCC)	1
US Billboard Hot 100	99
US Hot Rock & Alternative Songs (Billboard)	21
US Rock Airplay (Billboard)	21
US Alternative Airplay (Billboard)	7
US Adult Top 40 (Billboard)	16
US Mainstream Top 40 (Billboard)	30

=== Year-end charts ===
Chart (2010)	Position
Australia (ARIA)	85
Chart (2011)	Position
US Alternative Airplay (Billboard)	34

== Certifications ==
Region	Certification	Certified units/sales
Australia (ARIA)	Platinum	70,000^{^}
Germany (BVMI)	Gold	150,000^{‡}
New Zealand (RMNZ)	Gold	7,500^{*}
Portugal (AFP)	Platinum	20,000^{^}
United Kingdom (BPI)	Silver	200,000^{‡}
^{*} Sales figures based on certification alone.^{^} Shipments figures based on certification alone.^{‡} Sales+streaming figures based on certification alone.

== Release history ==
Release dates and formats for "Closer to the Edge"
Region	Date	Format	Label(s)	Ref.
United States	January 18, 2011	Mainstream airplay	Capitol	

== See also ==
- List of UK Rock & Metal Singles Chart number ones of 2010
