= Forever Night, Never Day Tour =

2006 concert tour by Thirty Seconds to Mars

- Continental tour by Thirty Seconds to Mars
- Location: North America
- Associated album: A Beautiful Lie
- Start date: March 7, 2006
- End date: June 1, 2006
- Legs: 2
- No. of shows: 58

Thirty Seconds to Mars concert chronology
- Forever Night, Never Day Tour (2006); Welcome to the Universe Tour (2006)

The Forever Night, Never Day Tour was the first headlining concert tour by American rock band Thirty Seconds to Mars, in support of their second studio album A Beautiful Lie (2005).

== Background ==
The tour was officially announced on January 24, 2006 through the band's official website. It was their first headlining tour; Thirty Seconds to Mars has previously served as opening act for bands like Audioslave, The Used, and My Chemical Romance. Set for March 2006, the tour showcased Thirty Seconds to Mars second studio album A Beautiful Lie, and commenced on March 7, 2006 in Tulsa, Oklahoma and ended on June 1, 2006 in Los Angeles, California. The band announced the tour shortly before releasing their single "The Kill". Thirty Seconds to Mars was forced to reschedule the first two shows of the tour due to a finger injury that bassist Matt Wachter had. In an interview with MTV News, Jared Leto described the tour as,

"It's time. After all these years on the road the fact that we still hadn't done a national headlining tour had become something that we were constantly asked about and encouraged to do. We are ready for that next step and we couldn't be more excited to finally get out there and present Thirty Seconds to Mars in the way that we see it. This is a tour that will offer a true alternative to the typical, mundane experience that seems to be readily available everywhere. We plan on presenting something very unique every single night and to create an experience that will never be forgotten. We want to welcome our family of friends, fans, and anyone and everyone to come and be a part of Forever Night, Never Day."

== Opening act ==
- Emanuel (select dates)
- Aiden (select dates)
- Keating (select dates)
- The Red Jumpsuit Apparatus (select dates)
- Men, Women & Children (select dates)

== Set list ==
This set list is representative of the show in Denver at the Ogden Theatre. It does not represent all dates throughout the tour.

1. "A Beautiful Lie"
2. "Capricorn (A Brand New Name)"
3. "Buddha for Mary"
4. "Battle of One"
5. "The Kill"
6. "The Story"
7. "R-Evolve"
8. "The Mission"
9. "Was It a Dream?"
10. "From Yesterday"
  Encore
11. "The Fantasy"
12. "Attack"

== Tour dates ==
| Date | City | Country | Venue |
|---|---|---|---|
North America
| March 7, 2006 | Tulsa | United States | Cain's Ballroom |
| March 9, 2006 | Dallas | United States | Lakewood Theater |
| March 10, 2006 | Houston | United States | Engine Room |
| March 11, 2006 | San Antonio | United States | White Rabbit |
| March 13, 2006 | Jacksonville | United States | Freebird Live |
| March 14, 2006 | St. Petersburg | United States | State Theatre |
| March 16, 2006 | Fort Lauderdale | United States | Culture Room |
| March 17, 2006 | Orlando | United States | House of Blues |
| March 18, 2006 | Atlanta | United States | The Masquerade |
| March 19, 2006 | Norfolk | United States | Norva Theatre |
| March 21, 2006 | Philadelphia | United States | Theatre of Living Arts |
| March 23, 2006 | New York City | United States | Avalon Theatre |
| March 24, 2006 | New York City | United States | Avalon Theatre |
| March 25, 2006 | Washington, D.C. | United States | American University |
| March 26, 2006 | Buffalo | United States | The Town Ballroom |
| March 28, 2006 | Millvale | United States | Mr. Small's Theatre |
| March 29, 2006 | Cleveland | United States | House of Blues |
| March 30, 2006 | Toronto | Canada | The Guvernment |
| March 31, 2006 | Toledo | United States | Headliners |
| April 1, 2006 | Chicago | United States | Cabaret Metro |
| April 4, 2006 | Columbus | United States | Newport Music Hall |
| April 6, 2006 | St. Louis | United States | The Pageant |
| April 7, 2006 | Milwaukee | United States | The Rave |
| April 8, 2006 | Minneapolis | United States | The Quest Club |
| April 9, 2006 | Winnipeg | Canada | West End Cultural Centre |
| April 11, 2006 | Calgary | Canada | The Whiskey |
| April 12, 2006 | Edmonton | Canada | Starlite Room |
| April 14, 2006 | Vancouver | Canada | Commodore Ballroom |
| April 15, 2006 | Seattle | United States | Showbox |
| April 16, 2006 | Boise | United States | The Big Easy |
| April 19, 2006 | Santa Cruz | United States | The Catalyst |
| April 21, 2006 | Las Vegas | United States | House of Blues |
| April 22, 2006 | Tempe | United States | The Marquee |
| April 24, 2006 | San Diego | United States | SOMA |
| April 25, 2006 | Santa Ana | United States | The Galaxy |
| April 26, 2006 | Cabazon | United States | Key Club at Morongo Casino |
| April 27, 2006 | Ventura | United States | Ventura Theatre |
| April 29, 2006 | Sacramento | United States | The Boardwalk |
| May 6, 2006 | Allston | United States | Harpers Ferry |
| May 7, 2006^{[A]} | East Rutherford | United States | The Meadowlands |
| May 9, 2006 | South Burlington | United States | Higher Ground |
| May 10, 2006 | Providence | United States | Lupo's Heartbreak Hotel |
| May 12, 2006 | Atlantic City | United States | Music Box at the Borgata |
| May 13, 2006 | Uncasville | United States | Mohegan Sun Arena |
| May 14, 2006 | Towson | United States | Recher Theatre |
| May 15, 2006 | Richmond | United States | Alley Katz |
| May 17, 2006 | Charlotte | United States | Tremont Music Hall |
| May 18, 2006 | Columbia | United States | Headliners Mainstage |
| May 19, 2006 | Nashville | United States | City Hall |
| May 20, 2006 | New Orleans | United States | House of Blues |
| May 22, 2006 | Birmingham | United States | Zydeco |
| May 23, 2006 | Baton Rouge | United States | Varsity Theatre |
| May 24, 2006 | Austin | United States | La Zona Rosa |
| May 25, 2006 | Oklahoma City | United States | Bricktown Brewery |
| May 27, 2006 | Denver | United States | Ogden Theatre |
| May 28, 2006 | Salt Lake City | United States | Avalon Theatre |
| May 30, 2006 | San Francisco | United States | Great American Music Hall |
| June 1, 2006 | Los Angeles | United States | Avalon Theatre |

Festivals and other miscellaneous performances
^{A} This concert was a part of the Bamboozle Festival.

Cancellations and rescheduled shows

| March 4, 2006 | Salt Lake City, | Avalon | Rescheduled to May 28, 2006 |
| March 5, 2006 | Englewood, Colorado | Gothic Theatre | Rescheduled to May 27, 2006 and moved to the Ogden Theatre in Denver |
| March 30, 2006 | Toronto, Ontario | The Opera House | Moved to The Guvernment |
| April 3, 2006 | Grand Rapids, Michigan | The Intersection | Cancelled |
| April 20, 2006 | Bakersfield, California | Montgomery World Plaza | Cancelled |
| April 30, 2006 | San Francisco | Great American Music Hall | Rescheduled to May 30, 2006 |
| May 17, 2006 | Charlotte, North Carolina | Amos | Moved to the Tremont Music Hall |
