= Biscuit (disambiguation) =

Biscuit is a small baked product; the exact meaning varies markedly in different parts of the world.

Biscuit, The Biscuit, or Biscuits may also refer to:

== Food ==
- Biscuit (bread) (in North America), a small round of leavened quick bread that is tender, moist, and thick
- Beaten biscuit, a hard variety of North America biscuit, similar to hardtack
- Cookie, a small, often round, crisp, dry, and flat piece of flour confectionery known as a biscuit in many countries
- Cracker (food), a crisp, dry, thin, and savory flour wafer, also known as water biscuits or savory biscuits.
- Dog biscuit, a hard, dry cracker that is a type of dog food
- Hardtack, a dense biscuit consumed on long sea voyages, land migrations and military campaigns
- Sponge cake, some varieties known as biscuits

== People ==
- Chuck Biscuits, a drummer
- Marques Hagans, an American football player nicknamed "Biscuit"
- Cornelius Bennett, an American football player nicknamed "Biscuit"

== Arts, entertainment, and media ==
=== Fictional characters ===
- Biscuit, a fictional dog who is a character from the I Can Read! series of children's books
- Biscuit Krueger, a character from the manga series Hunter × Hunter

=== Music ===
- Biscuit or vinyl biscuit, a vinyl material before it is pressed into a gramophone record
- Biscuits (EP), a 1991 EP by funk metal band Living Colour
- "Biscuit" (song), a 2015 song by Ivy Levan
- "Biscuit," a song by Portishead from their 1994 album Dummy
- "Biscuits" (song), a 2015 song by American country singer Kacey Musgraves
- "Biscuits," a song by Ghostface Killah from his album The Pretty Toney Album

=== Other arts, entertainment, and media ===
- Biscuit (game), a drinking game originating in France using a pair of standard dice
- "Biscuit" (The Apprentice), a 2011 television episode
- "Biscuits", a Series B episode of the television series QI (2004)

== Other uses ==
- Biscuit (pottery) (or "bisque"), partly-made pottery that has been fired but not yet glazed
- Biscuit porcelain, unglazed porcelain as a finished product
- Behavioral Science Consultation Teams (BSCT, pronounced "biscuit"), groups of psychiatrists, other medical doctors, and psychologists who study detainees in American extrajudicial detention
- Biscuit Fire, a 2002 wildfire that took place in the Siskiyou National Forest
- Biscuit, a piece of compressed wood used for making woodworking joints with a biscuit joiner tool
- Biscuit, an inflatable tube used in the sport of biscuiting
- The Biscuit, a card carried at all times by the current U.S. president containing the Gold Codes
- Biscuits, a nickname for methadone
- Hockey puck, as in "He puts the biscuit in the basket!"
- Montgomery Biscuits, a minor league baseball team

== See also ==
- Making biscuits, a behavior seen in cats where they knead
- Seabiscuit (disambiguation)
- Biskit, an open source software package written in Python code
- Biskits, a restaurant chain in Florida that was bought out by Bojangles' Famous Chicken 'n Biscuits
- The Biskitts, a Hanna-Barbera cartoon featuring anthropomorphic dogs
- Bisquick a baking mix originally intended for making biscuits
