= Introducing the Dame =

EP by Ivy Levan
- Released: June 4, 2013
- Genre: Pop; blue-eyed soul
- Length: 11:26
- Label: Cherrytree; Interscope
- Producer: Patrick Nissley; Lucas Banker; Tomo Miličević

Ivy Levan chronology
| Introducing the Dame (2013) | Frostbitten (2015) |

Introducing the Dame is the debut EP by American singer Ivy Levan, released in the United States on June 4, 2013 by Cherrytree Records. It marks Levan's first official music release and is the first of two EPs which were released before her first full-length album, No Good (2015). Introducing the Dame was produced by Patrick Nissley, Lucas Banker, and Tomo Miličević.

The album was described as a "four-track powerhouse built on fiery-sweet melodies, bright but dirty beats, and Levan's endlessly smoldering vocals". Its sound was noted as a blues-infused pop. The album features the single "Hot Damn", which has garnered a million views on YouTube.

== Track listing ==
| No. | Title | Writer(s) | Length |
|---|---|---|---|
| 1. | "Money" | Levan; Lucas Banker; Chelsea Davis; Patrick Nissley | 2:33 |
| 2. | "Hot Damn" | Levan; Banker; Tomo Miličević; Nissley | 3:04 |
| 3. | "I Don't Wanna Wake Up" | Levan; Banker; Nissley | 3:00 |
| 4. | "Hang Forever" | Levan; Banker; Miličević; Nissley | 2:49 |
| Total length: | | | 11:26 |

== Charts ==
| Chart (2013) | Peak position |
|---|---|
| US Heatseeker Albums (Billboard) | 42 |
