= Riddlewood, Pennsylvania =

Unincorporated community in Pennsylvania, US

- Location of Riddlewood in Pennsylvania
- Coordinates: 39°54′20″N 75°25′57″W
- Country: United States
- State: Pennsylvania
- County: Delaware
- Township: Middletown
- Elevation: 262 ft (80 m)
- Time zone: UTC-5 (EST)
  - Summer (DST): UTC-4 (EDT)
- Zip code: 19063
- Area code: 610

Riddlewood is a residential housing development in Middletown Township, Delaware County, Pennsylvania, United States, a suburb of Philadelphia. The name comes from famous racehorse owner Samuel D. Riddle, who owned the property before it was developed in the 1950s. The names of the streets in Riddlewood are named after Sam Riddle's horses as follows: Man o' War, War Admiral, War Trophy, Rampart East, Rampart West, Anamosa, and Soldier Song.

There is also a Riddlewood Drive and a Palmer's Lane. The land for Riddlewood was purchased from the estate of Sam Riddle by the Arters Brothers. They, along with architect George Hay, developed the 218-acre (0.88 km^{2}) site. There are three types of houses in the neighborhood, ranch, split-level, and a few Cape Cods. Riddlewood is as much a sought after neighborhood today as it was 50 years ago. Sam Riddle regained some notoriety in recent years because of his mention in the popular film and book Seabiscuit.
