= Ivy Levan =

American singer

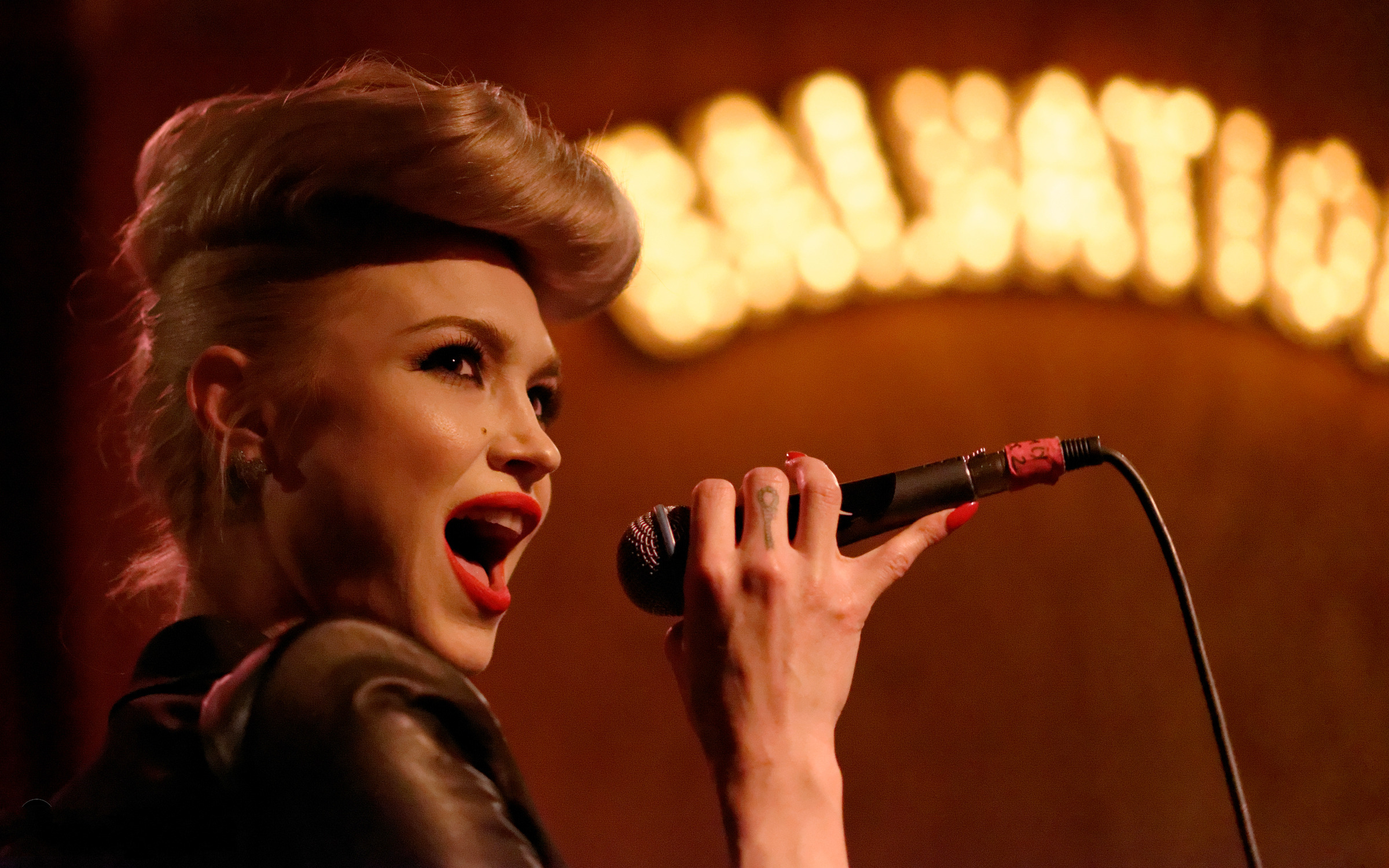
- Levan performing in Los Angeles in 2014

Background information
- Born: Ivy Rose Levan; Tulsa, Oklahoma, U.S.
- Origin: Bentonville, Arkansas, U.S.
- Genres: Pop; blue-eyed soul
- Occupations: Singer; songwriter; model; actress
- Years active: 2010–present
- Labels: BMG, Interscope, Cherrytree Records
- Partner: Adam Bravin

Ivy Rose Levan is an American singer. At 16, she moved to Los Angeles to pursue a music career, eventually signing to Cherrytree Records and Interscope Records. In 2013, she released her debut EP on Interscope Records titled Introducing the Dame which peaked at No. 1 on the Billboard Next Big Sound charts. The most popular single from the EP was "Hot Damn". Following a three-track single, Frostbitten, released by Cherrytree Records on December 15, 2014, she released the single, "Biscuit", on January 13, 2015. "Biscuit" also appeared on her first Cherrytree EP, No Good, released on August 7, 2015.

== Early life ==
Ivy Rose Levan was born in Tulsa, Oklahoma, and raised in Bentonville, Arkansas. The singer moved to Los Angeles with her mother when she was 16 years old to pursue a music career. Of the experience, Levan says "I just knew I needed to get out of there as fast as I could, so two weeks before I was supposed to graduate high school, I took off for L.A. with my mama." After experimenting with various musical styles, Levan began to use her Southern upbringing as a frame of reference, and as an influence which can be found in her music. During her career, Levan has worked with many artists of note, across genres. Among others, the singer has collaborated with Ben Weinman of The Dillinger Escape Plan, Tomo Miličević of Thirty Seconds to Mars, Sting, and Diplo.

== Career ==
=== 2013–2014: Introducing the Dame ===
In 2013, Levan released Introducing the Dame which peaked at No. 1 on the Billboard Next Big Sound charts. The EP features her most popular single from the album "Hot Damn", which has racked up over 6 million views on YouTube. The EP also included visual singles "Money", "I Don't Wanna Wake Up" and "Hang Forever". During the album's release, Levan was interviewed on Glamour Magazine and featured on CBS News' "The Feed." Levan was also featured on MTVu's Freshman segment, securing the winning spot twice and was dubbed as the "New It-Girl".

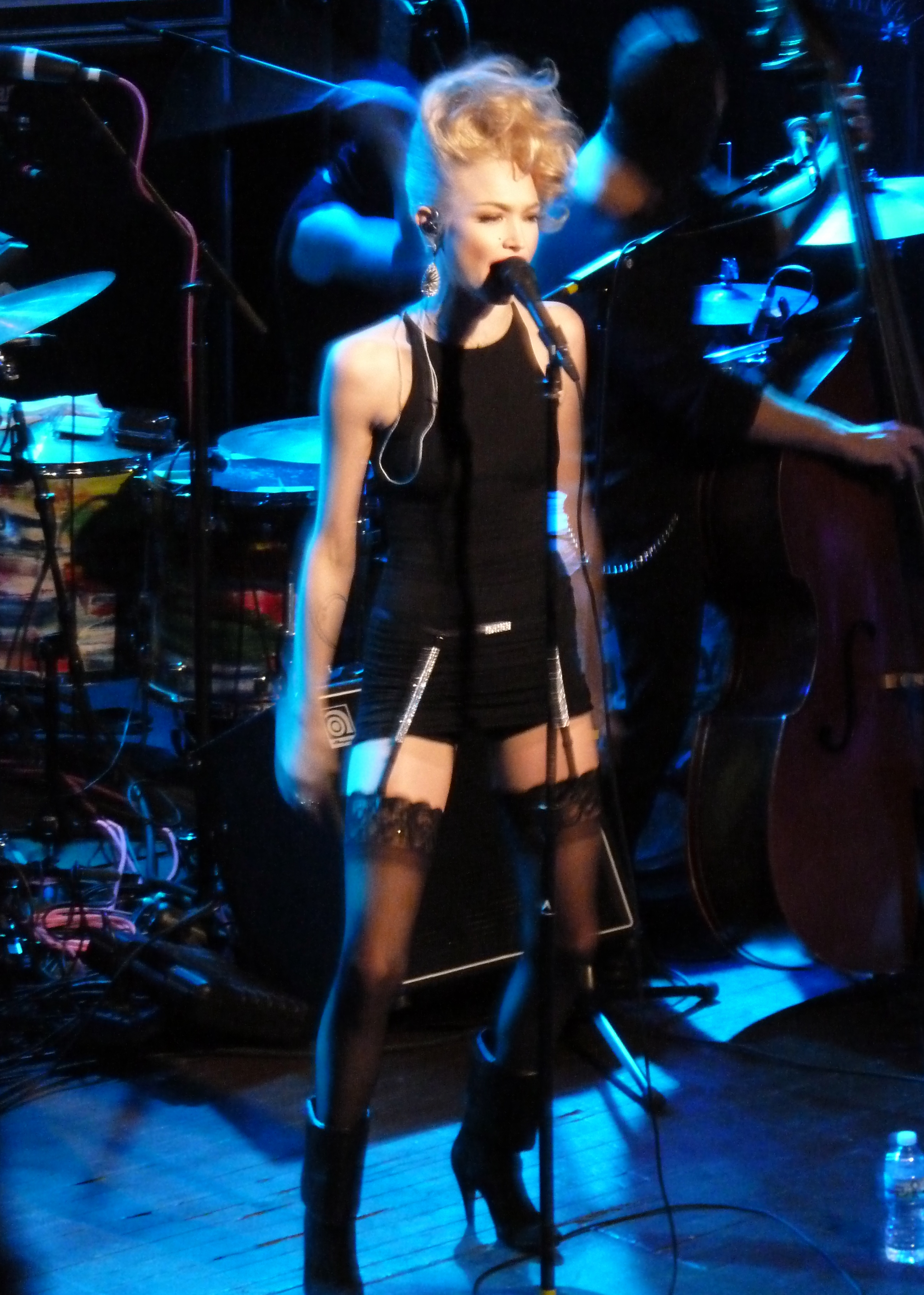
Levan performing in 2013

In December 2013, Levan was featured in a television commercial for the Beats By Dre Color Solo Headphones alongside Chris Cole, Jasmine Villegas, August Alsina, Nipsey Hussle, Nyjah Huston, Serena Williams and Alex Midler. Levan made her television performance debut February 2, 2014, on the Late Show with David Letterman in which she performed "Drive My Car" with Sting and Mike Einziger on day two of the Late Show's Beatles Tribute Week. Additionally, in June 2013, Levan supported Fitz & The Tantrums touring mostly the Mid-West and North-Eastern United States as well as Texas. During this tour, she also performed at clubs in support of the LGBT community. In October 2013, she supported Emeli Sandé. On April 17, 2014, Levan performed with Lisa Fischer for the 25th Anniversary of the Rainforest Fund Benefit Concert.

=== 2015–2017: No Good and The Rocky Horror Picture Show ===
In 2015, Levan released the first single "Biscuit" from her debut studio album titled No Good, which was released on August 7, 2015. The album was preceded by 2014 promotional single "The Dame Says" and promotional duets "27 Club" with Diplo and "Killing You" with Sting. She also sang the Bond-styled theme song "Who Can You Trust?" for the comedy film Spy. In 2016, it was announced that she would be singing the opening credits and starring as Usherette in Fox TV's production of The Rocky Horror Picture Show, which premiered in October 2016.

=== 2017–present: Fucc It and other ventures ===
In August 2017, she announced that she was in a new record deal with BMG. Along with this, she announced a new EP called Fucc It. In November 2018, Levan announced the release date of her upcoming single "Her" which was released on November 8, 2018. She later released "When I Get Home" and "Alive" alongside the EP, after which she went on hiatus to focus on her health. Since then, she has become an advocate for mental health and LGBT+ rights, opened an art gallery, and began a relationship with producer Adam Bravin, who is currently collaborating with her on her second studio album.

== Artistry ==
Levan's influences include Tina Turner, Mariah Carey, Ray Charles, Madonna, Ol' Dirty Bastard, Slayer and Beyoncé. Her musical style is sometimes dubbed as "Swamp-hop", a mixture of raw sounding soul music & synths.

== Personal life ==
Levan is openly bisexual and is also a model. She is signed to Ford Models, and has done ads for JCPenney, Payless ShoeSource and runway for Mercedes Benz Fashion Week.

== Discography ==
Studio albums
Title	Album details
No Good	Released: August 7, 2015; Formats: CD, Digital download; Label: Cherrytree Records

Extended plays
Title	Album details
Introducing the Dame	Released: June 4, 2013; Formats: CD, Digital download; Label: Cherrytree Records
Frostbitten	Released: January 6, 2015; Formats: Digital download; Label: Cherrytree Records
FUCC IT	Released January 25, 2019; Formats: Digital download; Label: BMG Rights Management

Soundtrack albums
Title	Album details
The Rocky Horror Picture Show: Let's Do the Time Warp Again	Released: October 21, 2016; Format: Digital download; Label: Ode Sounds & Visuals

== Filmography ==
Title	Year	Role	Other notes
Drop Dead Gorgeous	2010	Cynthia Barris	Main role
90210	2013	Singer	Season 5, Ep 2
Mob Wives	2013	Singer	Season 4
The Drama Queen	2014	Singer	Season 2
Banshee	2014	Singer	Series Premiere
Late Show with David Letterman	2014	Special Guest	Television performance
The Rocky Horror Picture Show: Let's Do the Time Warp Again	2016	Trixie, the Usherette	TV movie
