= Kevin Drake =

American musician

Kevin Drake (born March 26, 1979) is an American musician, who is best known for being one of the original touring guitarists in the rock band Thirty Seconds to Mars.

He grew up in Los Angeles, California, and started playing piano around five years of age. At 10, he started learning the guitar. He now plays multiple instruments and works with music production.

He was originally the bassist for Thirty Seconds to Mars, but was eventually brought on as an additional guitarist in 2001. Drake was only in Thirty Seconds to Mars for a little over a year, and left the band primarily due to touring issues.

He later went on to join a band called Dillusion, with Preston Moronie (a member of Hyper Crush) and Jason Evigan (singer for After Midnight Project).
