= From Yesterday =

2006 single by 30 Seconds to Mars

Single by Thirty Seconds to Mars

from the album A Beautiful Lie
- Released: October 17, 2006
- Length: 4:08
- Label: Immortal; Virgin
- Songwriters: Jared Leto; Shannon Leto; Tomo Miličević; Matt Wachter
- Producer: Josh Abraham

Thirty Seconds to Mars singles chronology
"The Kill (Bury Me)" (2006)	"From Yesterday" (2006)	"A Beautiful Lie" (2007)

Music video
- "From Yesterday" on YouTube

Audio sample
- From Yesterday: file; help

"From Yesterday" is a song by American rock band Thirty Seconds to Mars, and the third single released from their second album, A Beautiful Lie (2005). The song was serviced to US radio on October 17, 2006. It reached number one on the US Billboard Modern Rock Tracks chart, making it the band's first number one on any Billboard chart, and won the Kerrang! Award for Best Single. The music video for the song is believed to be the first ever American music video shot in the People's Republic of China in its entirety. The music video is also the last video by the band to feature bass player Matt Wachter.

== Music video ==
There are three video edits, a 13 and half-minute full edit complete with dialogue, scenes and ending credits, a 5 and half minute edit, an edited 4-minute version intended for broadcast. It was filmed using 400 Chinese soldiers (they are seen holding flags at the beginning of the video) and 20 horses. The film starts with a young boy, presumably the Emperor Puyi, being asked what he would like for his birthday. He simply states "The Sound of Tomorrow". The action then cuts to a plain white room with the band members, clad in white outfits similar to those worn in fencing, each doing their own thing in preparation for a show. An Asian woman enters and tells them that it is time. She leads them out into the hall and disappears. They walk down to the end of the hall where they attempt to open the door. They are unable to and understand it's locked, as Jared says. The lights start to flicker and they go out, leaving the band puzzled.

It then opens to another scene where the band is walking through giant gates into the row of Chinese soldiers, now wearing black ninja-like outfits. As they are all walking down, Jared notices a woman wearing a white mask walking on the exterior of the row, unnoticed by the others.

The band are then taken to the hall where the Emperor is situated, and are given scrolls. Jared then says to his brother, Shannon Leto (the band's drummer): "This is a gift?"

The band is then shown putting on supposedly traditional Chinese armor before meeting in an alleyway for a battle against four others, dressed in identical armor. This scene is mixed with each band member being led to a different part of the kingdom, encountering various practices believed to be Chinese traditions. Matt Wachter encounters the butler whipping himself who then laughs maniacally; Tomo Miličević finds a dead woman lying on her bed, and someone proceeds to put a small black ball (A black pearl of wisdom, which is a Chinese custom) into her mouth; Shannon sees a grown man being breast-fed by his mother or wife; and Jared accidentally walks in on silver long nosed masks wearing occult ritually preparing to sacrifice three young women with their heads in a single pillory board.

At the end of the video, the band members end up fighting each other and four warriors. They wear masks, and thus cannot see who is who. Four of the warriors are slain, and the remaining four wind up in a stalemate. They slowly remove their masks, revealing that 30 Seconds to Mars are all alive. The video then samples "A Beautiful Lie", released as the band's next single.

The video can be seen as a tribute to the film The Last Emperor since several of the scenes and characters are directly inspired by the film. The MV was shot on location in the Forbidden City and the Emperor Qin palace.

== Track listings ==
- Standard version
1. "From Yesterday" (radio edit) – 3:52
2. "The Story" – 3:59 (Live @ AOL Sessions Undercover)
- US (CD)
1. "From Yesterday" – 4:07
2. "The Story" – 3:59 (Live @ AOL Sessions Undercover)
- UK (CD)
1. "From Yesterday" (radio edit) – 3:52
2. "Stronger" – 6:01 (Radio 1's Live Lounge 2)
3. "From Yesterday" – 13:40 full director's cut video (enhanced CD)
- UK (7-inch vinyl 1)

This limited edition vinyl is clear, and comes in a gatefold case

1. "From Yesterday" – 4:14 (Chris Lord-Alge Mix)
2. "The Kill (Bury Me)" – 3:47 (Radio 1 Live)
- UK (7-inch vinyl 2)

This is also limited edition, but is red, and has the band members' signatures etched into the back

1. "From Yesterday" – 4:07
- US (7-inch vinyl 1)
1. "From Yesterday" – 4:07
2. "The Kill (Bury Me)" – 3:51

== Personnel ==
- Jared Leto – vocals, guitar
- Tomo Miličević – guitar, programming
- Matt Wachter – bass guitar, keyboard, synthesizers
- Shannon Leto – drums
- Oliver Goldstein – additional synthesizers

== Charts ==
=== Weekly charts ===
Weekly chart performance for "From Yesterday"
Chart (2007–2008)	Peak position
Australia (ARIA)	33
Austria (Ö3 Austria Top 40)	53
Canada Rock (Billboard)	18
Czech Republic Airplay (ČNS IFPI)	27
Finland Download (Latauslista)	16
Germany (GfK)	72
Italy (FIMI)	45
Netherlands (Single Top 100)	56
New Zealand (Recorded Music NZ)	13
Scottish Singles Sales (Official Charts)	10
Slovakia Airplay (ČNS IFPI)	78
UK Singles (Official Charts)	37
US Billboard Hot 100	76
US Alternative Airplay (Billboard)	1
US Mainstream Rock (Billboard)	11

=== Year-end charts ===
Year-end chart performance for "From Yesterday"
Chart (2007)	Position
US Modern Rock Tracks (Billboard)	7

== Certifications ==
Certifications and sales for "From Yesterday"
Region	Certification	Certified units/sales
New Zealand (RMNZ)	Gold	7,500^{*}
United Kingdom (BPI)	Silver	200,000^{‡}
^{*} Sales figures based on certification alone.

== Release history ==
Release dates and formats for "From Yesterday"
Region	Release date	Version
United States	November 7, 2006	Original
United Kingdom	January 16, 2007	Original
Australia	April 20, 2007	Original
Italy	April 20, 2007	Original
Latvia	February 4, 2008	Original
United Kingdom	February 4, 2008	Re-release

== In popular culture ==
- The song is also available as downloadable content for Guitar Hero 5 as of February 4, 2010.
