= Attack (Thirty Seconds to Mars song) =

Single by Thirty Seconds to Mars

from the album A Beautiful Lie
- Released: May 3, 2005
- Recorded: 2004–2005 at Pulse Recording, Los Angeles, California; The Laboratory, Los Angeles, California; The Center for the Advancement of the Arts and Sciences of Sound, Alaska; Lionshead Studios, South Africa; Circle in the Square Studio, New York City, New York
- Genre: Alternative rock; electronic rock; post-hardcore
- Length: 3:08
- Label: Immortal; Virgin
- Songwriter: Jared Leto
- Producers: Josh Abraham; Thirty Seconds to Mars

Thirty Seconds to Mars singles chronology
"Edge of the Earth" (2003)	"Attack" (2005)	"The Kill" (2006)

Music video
- "Attack" on YouTube

"Attack" is a song by American rock band Thirty Seconds to Mars. The song was released by Immortal and Virgin on May 3, 2005, as the lead single from the band's second album, A Beautiful Lie. The song was written by Jared Leto and was produced by Josh Abraham and 30 Seconds to Mars. The song is a dynamic expression of rebirth and renewal. 30 Seconds to Mars premiered the song on the American network Fuse on May 25, 2005, during Daily Download.

"Attack" has been critically appreciated, with reviewers complimenting its energetic keyboards, vast, abrasive guitars and infectious vocals. The song was the most added track on alternative radio in its first week, becoming a Billboard's Modern Rock top 30 hit. It attained success during the years, debuting for the first time on European charts only after two years of its original release. The accompanying music video, which aired on August 29, 2005, takes place in an abandoned hotel in Hollywood and every frame hides some messages.

== Background and recording ==
"Attack" had been around for a while and the band was unconvinced of its worth. The song proved to be somewhat problematic and was nearly excluded from the album. During an interview in 2005, Jared Leto said "'Attack' was a song that wasn't scheduled to be recorded at all. I'd been playing it – I'd play it in the desert in Morocco, I was playing it in Thailand – I was playing it everywhere." When Jared tried performing the song with the rest of the band, something was wrong. "On acoustic it was great; but when we played it as a band, it just fell flat on its face." "As soon as the bass got in there…" Matt Wachter continued. "Yeah, so it was either replace Matt or throw the song out." Jared played it acoustically for Josh Abraham; "I was playing it outside of the studio one night on acoustic guitar and Josh walked out and, as a joke, I said 'Hey, you wanna hear a hit song?' I was just talking. I started playing the verse and went into the chorus and he stopped me on the first chorus and said 'It's the best song you have. You have to record it'. So we all got in a circle and something about it changed. Something about us changed. And it became the first song on the record and the first single off our album. So he did a great job on encouraging us to do that song. And now I really love it." Jared told Josh Abraham that night "This song deserves to be a hit just so we can tell this story."

== Release ==
"Attack" was released as the lead single from the album on April 12, 2005, and to American radio on June 6, 2005. The single was released in the United Kingdom on February 19, 2007, pressed with the B-side "The Fantasy". On May 2, 2006, the song was released on the single "Two Beautiful Lies", which also includes an edit version of "The Kill" and a 36-page photo book of fans which submitted their digital photos. "Attack" live at CBGB was also released on the European single of "The Kill" and on the digital extended play of "A Beautiful Lie".

"Attack" was the most added track on alternative radio in its first week. It entered the Billboard Modern Rock Tracks at number 37 on July 16, 2005, and reached the peak position of 22 on October 22, 2005. On July 2, 2005, it peaked at number 38 on the Mainstream Rock Tracks. On March 3, 2007, it entered the UK Singles Chart at number 148. On the week ending April 20, 2008, the song peaked at number 22 on the Portuguese Download Chart.

The song is featured in the video games ATV Offroad Fury 4, The Fast and the Furious and in the EA Trax of Madden NFL 06 (Xbox 360 only). "Attack" was released as a purchasable download for the music video game series Rock Band on Christmas 2007. It is also available as downloadable content for Guitar Hero 5 as of February 4, 2010.

== Critical reception ==
"Attack" was generally acclaimed by music critics. Alternative Addiction commented that the song "soars sonically with processing mixed and forceful vocals." Alternative Addiction also ranked the song at number 11 on the Top 50 Songs of 2005. Jim Campbell of Playback wrote that "the standout tracks (“Attack”, “A Beautiful Lie”, and “The Kill”) all exude the same strong elements: interesting lyrics, sweeping vocals, and a pulsing rhythm section. They all display a remarkable amount of musical maturity and charisma." Mike Horvath of The Sheaf praised the keyboard effects and guitar distortions of the song, and Stuff listed the song as one of the top tracks from the album. Landon Christensen from Davis Enterprise felt that the song "is pretty catchy, with a cool keyboard pattern and Leto's impressive vocals." Jonathan Love of The Decatur Daily wrote that "Attack" "is an expression of rebirth featuring energetic keyboards, abrasive guitars and addictive vocals, which range from a pain-stricken wail to an intimate whisper." Jason Silverstein from The Buffalo News felt that "songs like 'The Kill,' 'Attack' and 'The Fantasy' show a little bit of the old school sound, and also how the new sound should have worked." Connie Phillips from Blogcritics commented that the song "is a digital extravaganza of synthesizers which gives way to Leto's powerful vocals. Though he occasionally moves to the screaming that is ever present in today's heavy music, he doesn't cheat on the vocals. For the most part, it is very melodic and his voice is commanding. What he is delivering with that voice is potent as well. The lyrics are intricate and nearly poetic. This song is a driven expression of endings and new beginnings. The deep seated emotions cross both sides of the spectrum, rage filled and mournful." Zone placed "Attack" at number 52 on the 210 Most Played Songs of the 2000s.

== Music video ==
The music video was directed by Paul Fedor, who had previously worked with the band for their 2002 video "Capricorn (A Brand New Name)". 30 Seconds to Mars performed and presented the premiere of the video on August 29, 2005, on Fuse's Daily Download. In Canada, the video premiered on MuchMusic during MuchOnDemand on October 6, 2005, and was added to medium rotation a couple of days later. Jared Leto told MTV News that "It's the first bestiality footage that you're ever going to see, but it's tastefully done. We're breaking new ground with this one." The music video for the song was filmed during July and August 2005 in an abandoned hotel in Hollywood where the crew encountered prostitutes and drug addicts squatting prior to filming. The crew ended up doing 70 effects shots in 7 days. Throughout the video, effects are greatly used for visual enhancement over band members and around the women depicted. Each frame of the video hides some messages including "This is a Cult". Fedor explained that was difficult to shoot the video, and commented "I think this is one of my best videos. Every shot in this one is perfect... Look for hidden messages in this one." The video found success on Fuse, mtvU, MTV2 and MuchMusic.

== Track listing ==
All songs written by Jared Leto.

Digital download

1. "Attack" – 3:08

Promo CD single

1. "Attack" – 3:12

UK picture disc 7" single

1. "Attack" – 3:09
2. "The Fantasy" – 4:29

== Credits and personnel ==
Credits adapted from A Beautiful Lie booklet.

- Performed by 30 Seconds to Mars
  - Jared Leto — vocals, guitar
  - Tomo Milicevic — guitar, programming
  - Matt Wachter — bass guitar, keyboards, synthesizer
  - Shannon Leto — drums
- Additional synthesizer by Oliver Goldstein
- Written by Jared Leto
- Published by Apocraphex Music (ASCAP)
- Produced by Josh Abraham and 30 Seconds to Mars
- Engineered by Ryan Williams
- Assistant engineer: Brandon Belsky
- Additional engineering by Brian Virtue
- Mixed by Tom Lord-Alge at South Beach Studios, Miami Beach, FL
- Mixing assistant: Hemio Fernandez
- Mastered by Brian Gardner at Bernie Grundman Mastering, Hollywood, CA

== Charts ==
=== Weekly charts ===
Weekly chart performance for "Attack"
Chart (2005–2008)	Peak position
Portugal Downloads (AFP)	22
Scotland Singles (OCC)	53
UK Singles (OCC)	148
UK Physical Singles (OCC)	51
US Mainstream Rock (Billboard)	38
US Alternative Airplay (Billboard)	22
Venezuela Pop Rock (Record Report)	2

=== Year-end charts ===
Year-end chart performance for "Attack"
Chart (2005)	Position
US Modern Rock Tracks (Billboard)	60

== Other versions ==
In 2023, Christian metalcore band Wolves at the Gate covered the song. "This song always stood out to me as such a powerful, raw, and emotional rock song." said band member Steve Cobucci, "Capturing the feeling of knowing your own brokenness and how it impacts other people made it easier to communicate the emotion from the original."
