= Seabiscuit (disambiguation) =

Seabiscuit was a champion Thoroughbred racehorse in the United States.

Seabiscuit or sea biscuit may also refer to:

- Hardtack, a hard type of edible beaten biscuit
- Seabiscuit: An American Legend, a 2001 book by Laura Hillenbrand about the horse of the same name
  - Seabiscuit (film), a 2003 film based on the book
- Sea biscuit (echinoderm), (Clypeaster) a genus of echinoderms
- Sea Biscuit, a 1994 album by Spacetime Continuum
- Sea biscuit, several species of sand dollar sea urchins
- Nickname of Max Seibald (born 1987), American lacrosse player
- Nickname of Jimmy Wilkes (1925–2008), American baseball player

== See also ==
- Biscuit, an inflatable ring towed behind a boat in tubing
- Biscuit (disambiguation)
- The Story of Seabiscuit, a 1949 American drama film directed by David Butler starring Shirley Temple
