= Thirty Seconds to Mars =

American rock band from Los Angeles

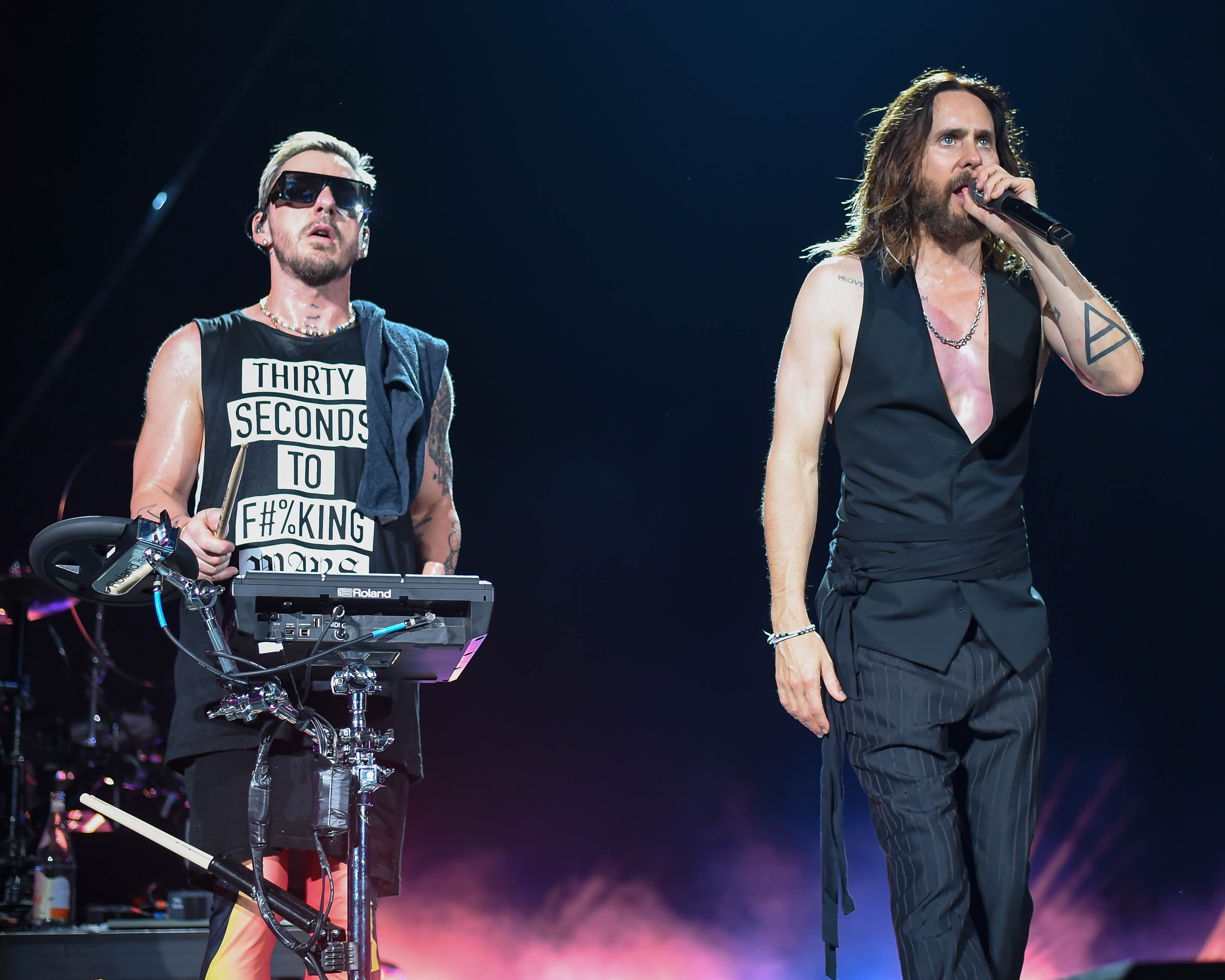
- Frontman Jared Leto and drummer Shannon Leto performing in West Palm Beach, Florida in August 2024

Background information
- Origin: Los Angeles, California, U.S.
- Genre: Alternative rock
- Works: Thirty Seconds to Mars discography
- Years active: 1998–present
- Labels: Capitol; Interscope; Virgin; Immortal; Concord
- Members: Jared Leto; Shannon Leto
- Past members: Tomo Miličević; Matt Wachter; Solon Bixler
- Website: thirtysecondstomars.com

Thirty Seconds to Mars (commonly stylized as 30 Seconds to Mars) is an American rock band formed in Los Angeles, California, in 1998. The band consists of brothers Jared (lead vocals, guitar, bass, keyboards) and Shannon Leto (drums, percussion), with various line-up changes throughout its history, most notably involving Tomo Miličević (lead guitar, bass, violin, keyboards, other instruments).

The band's debut album, 30 Seconds to Mars (2002), was produced by Bob Ezrin and released to positive reviews but only to limited commercial success relative. The band achieved worldwide fame with the release of its second album A Beautiful Lie (2005), which received multiple certifications all over the world. Its next release, This Is War (2009), showed a dramatic evolution in the band's musical style, as it incorporated experimental music as well as eclectic influences. The recording process of the album was marked by a legal dispute with record label EMI that eventually became the subject of the documentary film Artifact (2012). Thirty Seconds to Mars then moved to Universal Music and released the fourth album, Love, Lust, Faith and Dreams (2013), to commercial success. It was followed by America (2018) and It's the End of the World but It's a Beautiful Day (2023), which both polarized critics upon release.

As of September 2014, the band had sold over 15 million albums worldwide. The band is noted for its energetic live performances and for fusing elements from a wide variety of genres, through its use of philosophical and spiritual lyrics, concept albums, and experimental music. Thirty Seconds to Mars has received several awards and accolades throughout its career, including a Guinness World Record, and has been included in the Kerrang! list of best artists of the 2000s.

== History ==
=== 1998–2000: Formation and first years ===
Thirty Seconds to Mars started in 1998 in Los Angeles, California, as a collaboration between brothers Jared Leto and Shannon Leto, who had been playing music together since their childhood. The duo later expanded to a four-piece when they added guitarist Solon Bixler and bassist Matt Wachter to the line-up. Additional guitarist Kevin Drake, who first auditioned for the position of bassist, also joined the band as a touring musician. The band played its first concerts under different names, before finally settling on the name "Thirty Seconds to Mars", which Jared Leto stated was inspired by a rare manuscript titled Argus Apocraphex. Leto described the name as "a reference, a rough translation from the book. I think the idea is interesting, it's a metaphor for the future," he explained. "Thirty seconds to Mars—the fact that we're so close to something that's not a tangible idea. Also Mars being the God of War makes it really interesting, as well. You could substitute that in there, but what's important for my brother and I, is that it be imaginative and really represent the sound of our music in as unique a way as possible." He further characterized the name as working "on several different levels, a phrase that is lyrical, suggestive, cinematic, and filled with immediacy." Although Leto cited Argus Apocraphex as the source of the name, inquiries to the Harvard Library have not identified any such manuscript. This has led to speculation that the title may not correspond to any existing work but could instead have been created as a conceptual or imaginative reference by the band.

When Thirty Seconds to Mars first started, Jared Leto did not allow his vocation as a Hollywood actor to be used in promotion of the band. By 1998, they performed gigs at small American venues and clubs. Their eponymous debut album had been in the works for a couple of years, with Leto writing the majority of the songs. During this period, the band recorded demo tracks such as "Valhalla" and "Revolution", or "Jupiter" and "Hero", which later appeared on the band's debut album as "Fallen" and "Year Zero" respectively, but also "Buddha for Mary". Their work led to a number of record labels being interested in signing Thirty Seconds to Mars, which eventually signed to Immortal Records. In 1999, Virgin Records entered into the contract.

=== 2001–2003: Debut album ===
"Edge of the Earth"
"Edge of the Earth", taken from the band's self-titled debut album, mixes sounds from different genres and styles.

Thirty Seconds to Mars retreated to the isolation of Wyoming's countryside in 2001 to record their debut album, working with producers Bob Ezrin and Brian Virtue. They contacted Ezrin because they grew up listening to his work with Pink Floyd, Kiss and Alice Cooper and they felt he was the only one who could help them capture the size and scope of what they wanted to accomplish on their debut recording. The band chose an empty warehouse lot on 15,000 acres (6,100 hectares), striving for the precise location that would enhance their sound. Even before the album was released, Puddle of Mudd invited Thirty Seconds to Mars to open a six-week tour for them in the spring of 2002. The band later embarked on a North American tour to support Incubus and began a club tour in August.

The band released their first studio album, 30 Seconds to Mars, on August 27, 2002, in the United States through Immortal and Virgin. Jared Leto described the record as a concept album that focuses on human struggle and self-determination, in which otherworldly elements and conceptual ideas are used to illustrate a truthful personal situation. The album reached number 107 on the US Billboard 200 and number one on the US Top Heatseekers, selling 121,000 copies in the United States. It was preceded by the single "Capricorn (A Brand New Name)", which peaked at number 31 on the US Mainstream Rock chart. Upon its release, 30 Seconds to Mars was met with mostly positive reviews; music critic Megan O'Toole felt that the band has "managed to carve out a unique niche for themselves in the rock realm." The album was a slow-burning success, and eventually sold two million copies worldwide as of March 2011.

In October 2002, the band toured with I Mother Earth and Billy Talent on MTV Campus Invasion. The following month, Thirty Seconds to Mars made their first appearance on television on Last Call with Carson Daly and opened concerts for Our Lady Peace and Sevendust. Released in 2003, "Edge of the Earth" became the second single from the album. In early 2003, Bixler left the band due to issues primarily related to touring. He was later replaced by Tomo Miličević, who successfully auditioned for the part of guitarist. The band later went on tour with Chevelle, Trust Company, and Pacifier, and took a slot on the 2003 Lollapalooza tour.

=== 2004–2008: A Beautiful Lie ===
"The Kill"
"The Kill" was heavily influenced by '90s alternative rock. It was the second single from A Beautiful Lie.

Thirty Seconds to Mars returned to the studio in March 2004 to begin working on their second album A Beautiful Lie, with Josh Abraham producing. During the recording process, the band traveled to four continents to accommodate Jared Leto's acting career. A Beautiful Lie was notably different from the band's debut album, from both musical and lyrical aspect. "On the first record I created a world, then hid behind it," Leto said. "With A Beautiful Lie, it was time to take a more personal and less cerebral approach. Although this record is still full of conceptual elements and thematic ideas it is ultimately much more wrapped around the heart than the head. It's about brutal honesty, growth, change. It's an incredibly intimate look into a life that is in the crossroads. A raw emotional journey. A story of life, love, death, pain, joy, and passion. Of what it is to be human."

A Beautiful Lie was released on August 30, 2005, in the United States. It has since been certified platinum by the Recording Industry Association of America (RIAA), and has reached platinum and gold status in several countries, with a sales total of over four million. Its lead single, "Attack", made its radio debut on June 6, 2005, and became the most added track on American modern rock radio during its first week of release. During 2005, Thirty Seconds to Mars went on tour with Chevelle, Audioslave and The Used. The group embarked on their first headlining tour Forever Night, Never Day in March 2006. At the same time, the band released the album's second single, "The Kill", which set a record for the longest-running hit in the history of the US Modern Rock chart when it remained on the national chart for more than 50 weeks, following its number three peak in 2006. Its music video, directed by Jared Leto under the pseudonym of Bartholomew Cubbins, received a largely positive response and numerous accolades, including an MTV Video Music Award.

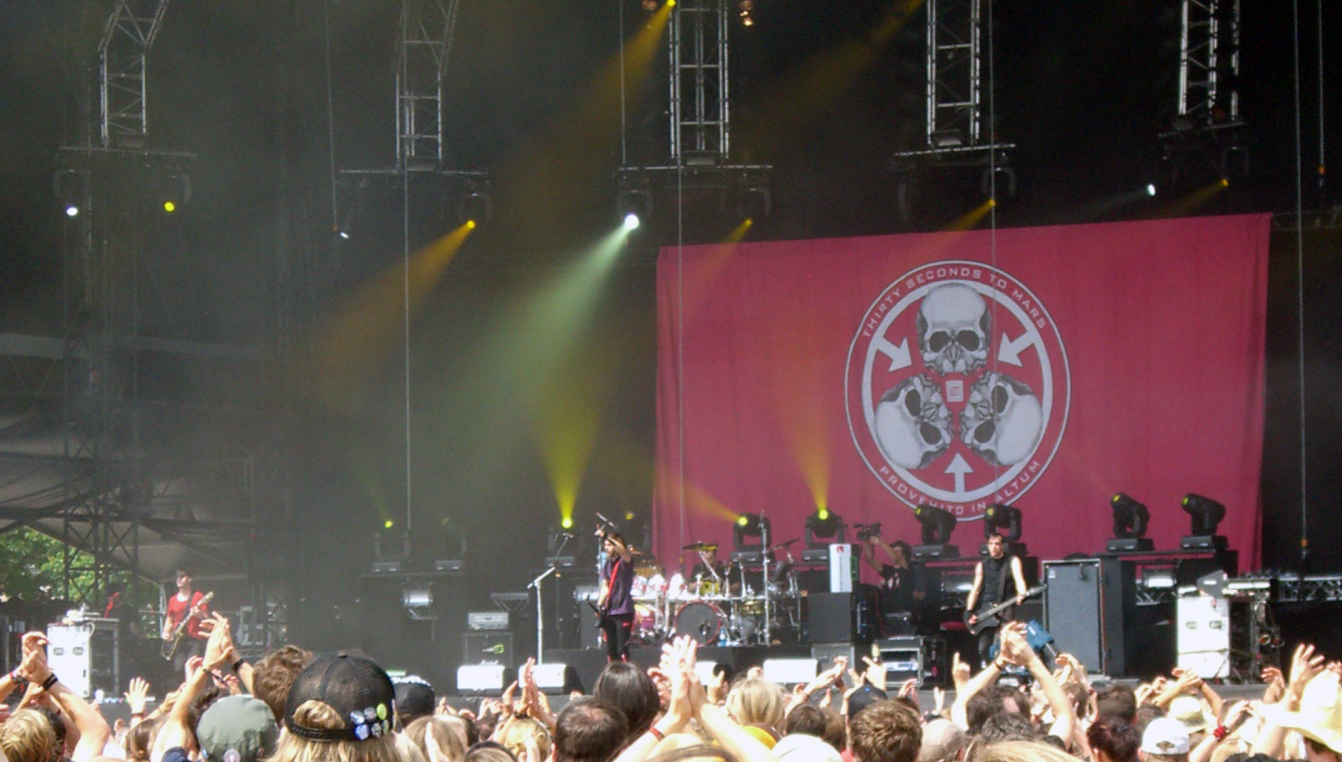
Thirty Seconds to Mars live in Germany during the A Beautiful Lie tour

In October 2006, the band began their Welcome to the Universe Tour, sponsored by MTV2, and were supported by Head Automatica, The Receiving End of Sirens, Cobra Starship, and several other bands including Street Drum Corps. The third single from the album, "From Yesterday", was released in November 2006 and became the band's first number one on the Billboard's Modern Rock Tracks. Jared Leto directed a short film for the single, which became the first-ever American music video shot in the People's Republic of China in its entirety. A Beautiful Lie was released in Europe in February 2007. During the year, Thirty Seconds to Mars toured extensively throughout Europe and played at several major festivals, including Roskilde, Pinkpop, Rock am Ring, and Download. In March 2007, Matt Wachter left the group to spend more time with his family and was replaced by Tim Kelleher, performing live only.

On November 1, 2007, Thirty Seconds to Mars won an MTV Europe Music Award in the category of Best Rock. The band also received the Kerrang! Award for Best Single in two consecutive years for "The Kill" and "From Yesterday" in 2007 and 2008, respectively. The album's title track, "A Beautiful Lie", was released as the fourth single in North America and selected European countries. Its music video was filmed 200 miles north of the Arctic Circle in Greenland, and proceeds from the sales benefited the Natural Resources Defense Council. At the 2008 MTV Europe Music Awards on November 6, Thirty Seconds to Mars earned their second Best Rock and Best Video for "A Beautiful Lie".

=== 2008–2011: EMI lawsuit and This Is War ===
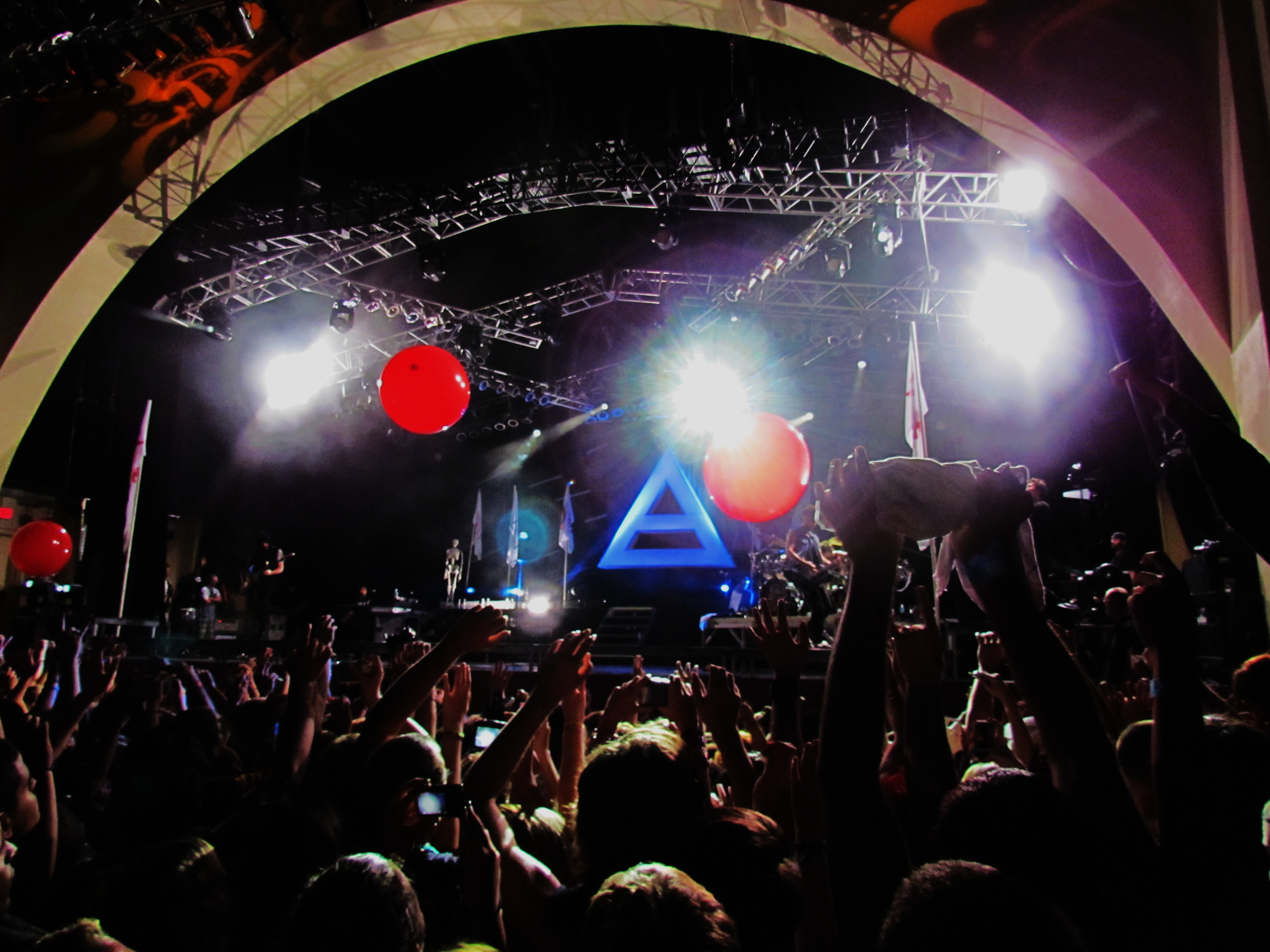
Performing in Orlando, Florida, during their Into the Wild Tour

Thirty Seconds to Mars began recording their third studio album, This Is War, in August 2008. To produce the record, the band worked with Flood and Steve Lillywhite. Thirty Seconds to Mars had attempted to sign with a new label after the A Beautiful Lie tour, prompting EMI (the parent label of Virgin) to file a lawsuit for $30 million. EMI claimed that the band had failed to produce three of the five records they were obliged to deliver under their 1999 contract, which Virgin entered into with the now-defunct Immortal Records. Jared Leto responded to some of the claims in the suit stating "under California law, where we live and signed our deal, one cannot be bound to a contract for more than seven years." Thirty Seconds to Mars had been contracted for nine years, so the band decided to exercise their "legal right to terminate our old, out-of-date contract, which, according to the law is null and void."

After nearly a year of the lawsuit battle, the band announced on April 28, 2009, that the case had been settled. The suit was resolved following a defense based on a contract case involving actress Olivia de Havilland decades before. Leto explained, "The California Appeals Court ruled that no service contract in California is valid after seven years, and it became known as the De Havilland Law after she used it to get out of her contract with Warner Bros." Thirty Seconds to Mars then signed a new contract with EMI. Leto said the band had resolved their differences with EMI and the decision had been made because of "the willingness and enthusiasm by EMI to address our major concerns and issues, [and] the opportunity to return to work with a team so committed and passionate about Thirty Seconds to Mars."

In a bid to involve their fans in This Is War, Thirty Seconds to Mars held an event, called the Summit, at the Avalon Club in Los Angeles, where they invited fans to provide backing vocals and percussion. After the success of the initial Summit, the group repeated the event in eight countries and extended it digitally. The band also invited fans to submit close-up shots of their faces in order to make 2,000 different individual covers for the album. Leto described This Is War as a record about survival: "It was a two-year creative battle that was ferocious and tough but creatively rewarding, and all of those adverse elements, in hindsight, made us stronger and made the record stronger."

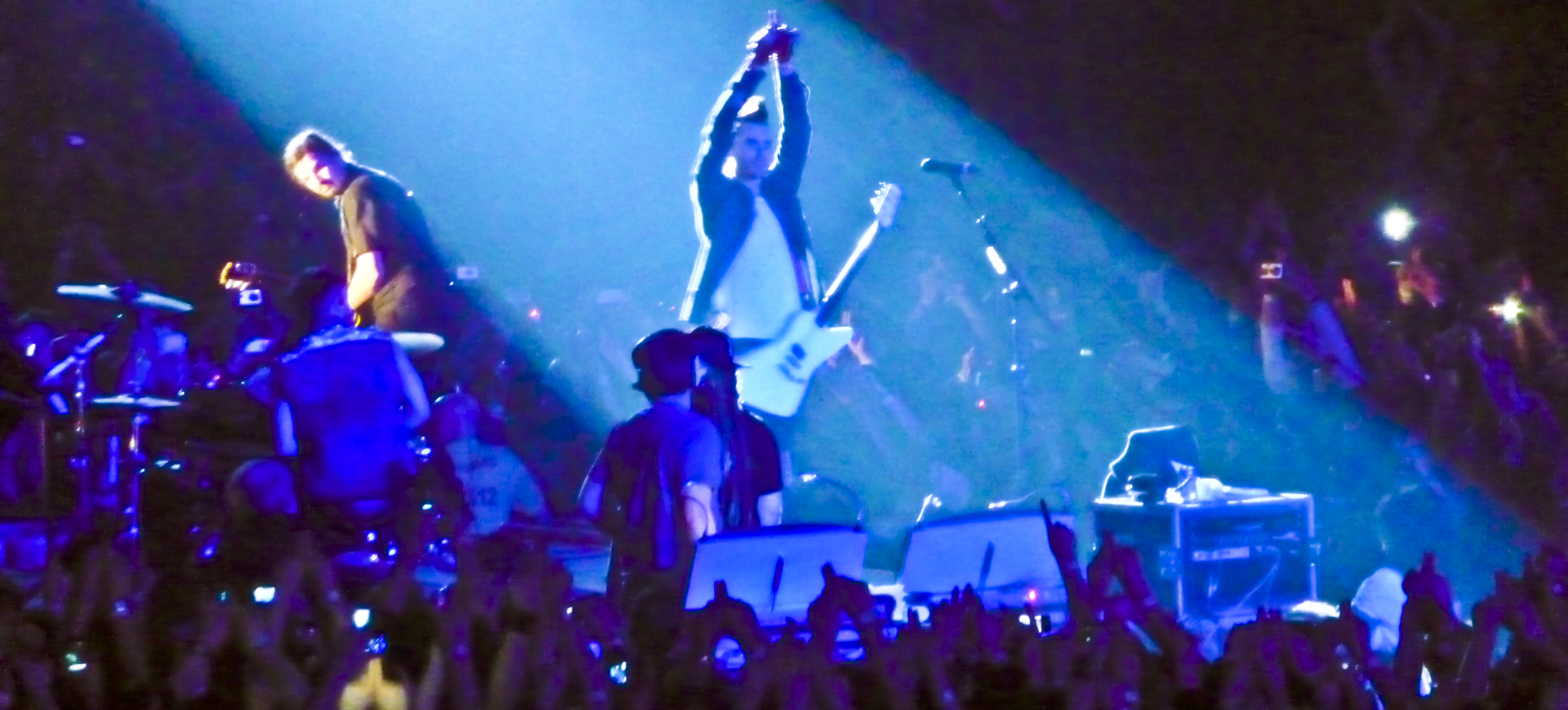
Thirty Seconds to Mars playing in Manchester, England, in February 2010

Although the release date was changed many times, This Is War was eventually released on December 8, 2009. The album reached the top ten of several national album charts and entered the Billboard 200 at number 18, with first-week sales of 67,000 in the United States. Its first two singles, "Kings and Queens" and "This Is War", reached the number-one spot on the US Alternative Songs chart. After a promotional tour in winter 2009, Thirty Seconds to Mars embarked on their Into the Wild Tour in February 2010.

At the 2010 MTV Video Music Awards, "Kings and Queens" received four nominations, including Video of the Year and Best Direction, and went on to win Best Rock Video. The album's third single, "Closer to the Edge", was the 2010 best-selling rock single in the United Kingdom, topping the UK Rock Chart for eight consecutive weeks. Thirty Seconds to Mars collaborated with rapper Kanye West on the song "Hurricane", which was released on the deluxe edition of This Is War and became the album's fourth single in some countries. On November 7, Thirty Seconds to Mars and West performed "Hurricane" at the 2010 MTV Europe Music Awards at the Puerta de Alcalá in Madrid, where the band also received their third Best Rock. On May 13, 2011, Thirty Seconds to Mars recorded a performance for the television program MTV Unplugged. They performed with musicians from the Vitamin String Quartet and invited a gospel choir to join the group for a rendition of U2's song "Where the Streets Have No Name".

A Songkick study indicated that, based on quantity of tour dates, Thirty Seconds to Mars was among the hardest-working touring artists in 2010. On October 16, 2011, it was announced that the band would enter the Guinness World Records for most live shows during a single album cycle, with 300 shows. The 300th show, called Tribus Centum Numerarae, took place on December 7, 2011, at the Hammerstein Ballroom in New York City and was followed by a special series of shows which marked the end of the Into the Wild Tour.

=== 2012–2015: Love, Lust, Faith and Dreams ===
Thirty Seconds to Mars took a break from touring in 2012 and spent most of the year recording their fourth album, entitled Love, Lust, Faith and Dreams. The album was produced by Jared Leto with previous collaborator Steve Lillywhite. Leto said that the band took a new direction with Love, Lust, Faith and Dreams. He explained that the album "is more than an evolution, it's a brand new beginning. Creatively, we've gone to an entirely new place, which is exciting, unexpected, and incredibly inspiring." In September 2012, Artifact, a documentary about the band's legal battle against the record label EMI and the making of This Is War, premiered at the Toronto International Film Festival and won the People's Choice Documentary Award.

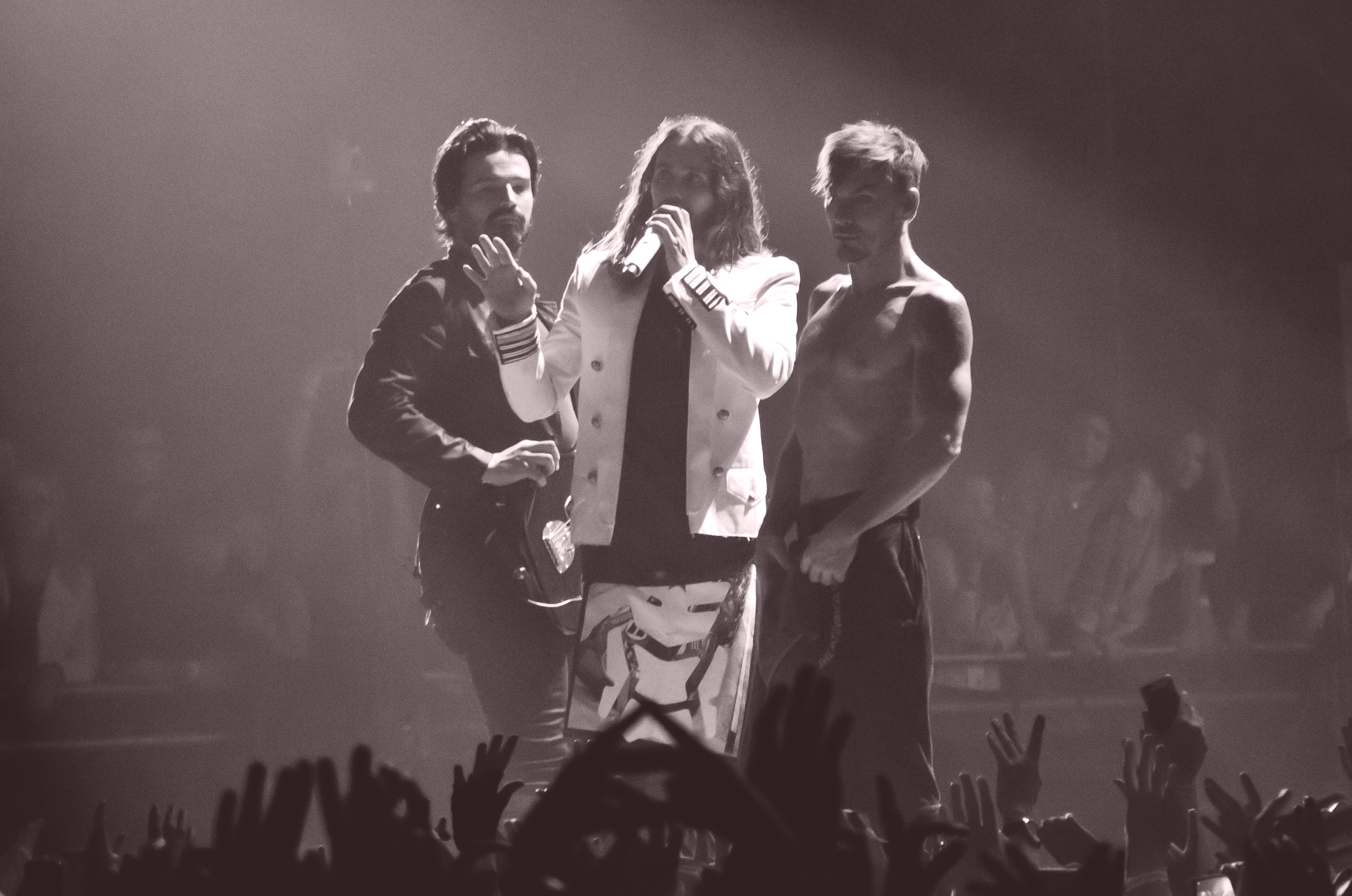
Thirty Seconds to Mars in Moscow, Russia, in March 2014

In February 2013, it was announced that "Up in the Air" would be the first single from the fourth album. In partnership with NASA, Thirty Seconds to Mars launched the first copy of "Up in the Air" aboard the Dragon spacecraft on SpaceX CRS-2. The mission was launched atop a Falcon 9 rocket on March 1, 2013, sending the first ever commercial copy of music into space. On March 18, 2013, the single premiered from the International Space Station, after a Q&A session with the band and Expedition 35 flight engineer Tom Marshburn, while Annise Parker, mayor of the city of Houston, proclaimed the Thirty Seconds to Mars Day. "Up in the Air" made its radio debut on March 18 and became commercially available for downloading the following day. The song reached number three on the US Alternative Songs chart and experienced success in international markets.

Thirty Seconds to Mars released Love, Lust, Faith and Dreams on May 17, 2013 in the Netherlands, on May 20 in the UK, and on May 21 through Universal in the United States. The album received generally positive reviews and reached the top ten in more than fifteen countries, including the United Kingdom and the United States. The band began their Love, Lust, Faith and Dreams Tour in June, which included festival dates at Rock Werchter, Pinkpop, Rock in Rio, and Rock am Ring. The second single from the album, "Do or Die", achieved a level of play on modern rock radio, while "City of Angels", the third single, was released to rave reviews from critics and eventually reached number eight on the Alternative Songs chart in the US. At the 2013 MTV Video Music Awards, held on August 25, "Up in the Air" won the award for Best Rock Video.

Thirty Seconds to Mars announced on April 25, 2014, that they have parted from Virgin Records after tumultuous years with the label, with Leto telling Billboard, "We're free and clear and excited about the future. It's the most wonderful place to be." In August 2014, the group embarked on a double-headline tour, dubbed the Carnivores Tour, with American rock band Linkin Park, visiting arenas and stadiums throughout North America. Thirty Seconds to Mars then launched a music festival called Camp Mars. The first edition took place in Malibu, California, in August 2015 and included a series of activities in a semi-rustic setting and several DJ sets.

=== 2015–2021: America and Tomo Miličević’s departure ===
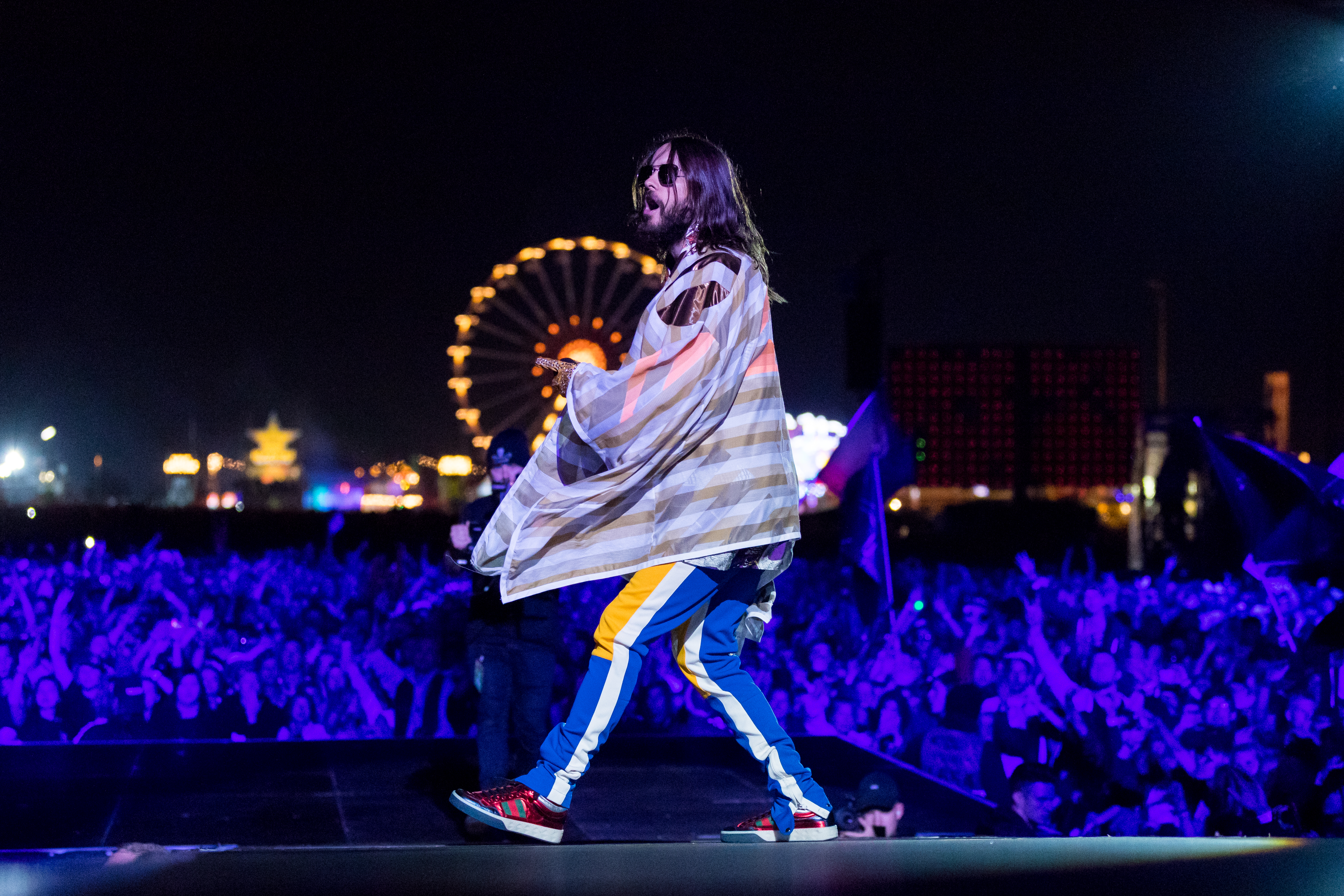
Performing at the 2018 Rock im Park during the Monolith Tour

On November 3, 2015, it was announced that Thirty Seconds to Mars was working on their fifth studio album. In August 2016, the band revealed to have signed to Interscope Records. The group later unveiled that they would embark on a North American tour with Muse and PVRIS, which took place from May to September 2017. In August 2017, "Walk on Water" was announced as the lead single from the band's fifth album. Thirty Seconds to Mars then performed the song at the 2017 MTV Video Music Awards featuring special guest Travis Scott. During the ceremony, Jared Leto received media attention for his tribute to musicians Chester Bennington and Chris Cornell, who both died earlier that year.

On January 25, 2018, Thirty Seconds to Mars released "Dangerous Night" as the second single from their upcoming fifth studio album. In February 2018, the band officially announced the Monolith Tour with Walk the Moon, Misterwives, K. Flay, Joywave, and Welshly Arms. Thirty Seconds to Mars later confirmed America as title of their fifth album, which was released on April 6, 2018. The album received polarized reviews from critics and debuted at number two on the Billboard 200, becoming the band's highest entry on the chart. America also reached the top ten in seventeen other countries, including number one in Germany and Austria.

During the first leg of the Monolith Tour, it was announced that Miličević would be taking a break from touring due to personal matters. On June 11, 2018, he officially announced his departure from the band.

=== 2021–2025: It's the End of the World but It's a Beautiful Day ===
On October 5, 2021, Leto announced that he would be featured in a song with Illenium called "Wouldn't Change a Thing". On August 27, 2022, Thirty Seconds to Mars announced a commemorative 20th-anniversary version of its debut album. On February 22, 2023, it was announced that the band would be playing at When We Were Young on October 22, 2023. On May 8, 2023, Thirty Seconds to Mars released "Stuck", the lead single from their upcoming sixth studio album, It's the End of the World but It's a Beautiful Day, which was released on September 15. The second track of the album, "Life Is Beautiful", was released as promotional single on June 9.

On August 16, 2025, the band performed a show at the Kia Forum celebrating the 20th anniversary of A Beautiful Lie. Tomo Miličević joined the band on stage for a handful of songs in their first performance together in over seven years. During the show, Jared announced that they will be re-releasing A Beautiful Lie around November with several unreleased songs and an acoustic version of The Kill. He also confirmed that their next studio album will return the band to their alternative rock sound.

== Musical style ==
The style of the band's first studio album combined progressive metal and space rock with influences and elements from electronica, utilizing programming and synthesizers. Ryan Rayhill from Blender described the album as a "high-minded space opera of epic scope befitting prog-rock prototypes Rush," and wrote that Thirty Seconds to Mars "emerged with an eponymous debut that sounds like Tool on The Dark Side of the Moon," referring to the 1973 album by Pink Floyd. During this period, the band was also part of the short-lived "Undercore" movement.

"Kings and Queens"
From the album This Is War, "Kings and Queens" features influences and elements from arena rock.

"City of Angels"
"City of Angels" was cited as an example of variety and experimentation in Love, Lust, Faith and Dreams.

Whereas the eponymous concept album's lyrics focus on human struggle and self-determination, A Beautiful Lie's lyrics are more personal and the music introduces screaming vocals. The transformation that resonates throughout the album reflects the personal and artistic changes experienced by the band members before and during the creation of the record. The album widened the band's sound by combining elements from progressive rock, hard rock and emo. Such alternative rock style has been compared to bands like The Cure, U2 and The Smashing Pumpkins.

Their third release This Is War was described as "an extremely progressive rock sound with killer choruses," drawing inspirations from experimental Pink Floyd to melodic M83. Chris Harris from Rolling Stone considered it "an ambitious collection of experimental rock" shaped by the band's personal struggles and legal battle with their record label. Stephen Thomas Erlewine of AllMusic acknowledged the band's progression, referring to the overall style of the record as a mixture of synth rock, heavy metal, and progressive rock.

In Love, Lust, Faith and Dreams the band experimented with different instruments and drew influences from a wider and more varied range of styles. The album mixes experimental instrumentation with elements both symphonic and electronic, and the music introduces a minimalist approach full of ethereal sonics. The record carries the concept album format of This Is War and expands the spectrum to revolve around the themes after which it is named.

== Activism ==
Thirty Seconds to Mars launched a website, called abeautifullie.org, to provide information about environmental issues and ways to participate in environmental activities. People can make donations through the site to support the Natural Resources Defense Council. In 2006, Jared Leto created the cover art for The 97X Green Room: Volume 2, a compilation of live music that includes a Thirty Seconds to Mars song, which proceeds from the sales benefited The Nature Conservancy. During their Welcome to the Universe Tour, the group worked to develop strategies that would minimize fuel consumption to offset the impact that the tour would have had on the environment.

In June 2008, the band joined Habitat for Humanity to work on a home being repaired and renovated through the Greater Los Angeles Area's "A Brush With Kindness" program. In advance of the build, the band organized an auction of "build slots" to give fans the opportunity to volunteer alongside them. In less than a week, six extra workers were enlisted and over $10,000 was raised to fund additional Habitat for Humanity projects. Thirty Seconds to Mars fans, termed the Echelon, started several philanthropic organizations and projects with the purpose of supporting various charities and humanitarian causes.

After the 2010 Haiti earthquake, Thirty Seconds to Mars raised $100,100 for Haitian relief through a charity auction. The band has also supported the Haitian population through the Echelon project "House for Haiti" and Hope For Haiti Now telethon special. The group auctioned a quantity of items raising funds to help the Red Cross assist people affected by the 2011 Tōhoku earthquake and tsunami. The band contributed one dollar per concert ticket sold on the Carnivores Tour to the charity Music for Relief to support disaster relief and programs to protect and restore the environment.

== Band members ==
Current members

- Jared Leto – lead vocals, guitars, bass, keyboards, piano, synthesizers (1998–present)
- Shannon Leto – drums, percussion (1998–present)

Former members

- Matt Wachter – bass, keyboards, synthesizers, backing vocals (2001–2007)
- Solon Bixler – guitars, keyboards, backing vocals (2001–2003)
- Tomo Miličević – guitars, bass, keyboards, violin, percussion, backing vocals (2003–2018; guest 2025)

Current touring musicians

- Stevie Aiello – bass, guitars, keyboards, backing vocals (2013–present)

Former touring musicians

- Kevin Drake – guitars (2001–2002)
- Tim Kelleher – bass, keyboards, guitar, backing vocals (2007–2010, 2011)
- Braxton Olita – keyboards, guitars, backing vocals (2009–2011)
- Matt McJunkins – bass, keyboards, guitar, backing vocals (2011)

== Discography ==
Studio albums

- 30 Seconds to Mars (2002)
- A Beautiful Lie (2005)
- This Is War (2009)
- Love, Lust, Faith and Dreams (2013)
- America (2018)
- It's the End of the World but It's a Beautiful Day (2023)

== Concert tours ==
- Forever Night, Never Day Tour (2006)
- Welcome to the Universe Tour (2006)
- A Beautiful Lie Tour (2007–2008)
- Into the Wild Tour (2010–2011)
- Love, Lust, Faith and Dreams Tour (2013–2015)
- Carnivores Tour (with Linkin Park) (2014)
- Monolith Tour (2018–2019)
- Seasons Tour (2024–2025)

== See also ==
- List of artists who reached number one on the U.S. alternative rock chart
- List of awards and nominations received by Thirty Seconds to Mars
