= No Good (Ivy Levan album) =

Studio album by Ivy Levan
- Released: August 7, 2015
- Recorded: 2014–15
- Genre: Soul; pop; dance; hip hop; smooth soul; R&B
- Length: 36:06
- Label: Cherrytree; Interscope

Ivy Levan chronology
| Frostbitten (2015) | No Good (2015) |

Singles from No Good (Official singles)
- 1. "Biscuit" Released: January 13, 2015; 2. "Killing You" Released: June 2, 2015

Singles from No Good (Promotional singles)
- 1. "The Dame Says" Released: December 2, 2014; 2. "27 Club" Released: July 10, 2015; 3. "No Good" Released: July 24, 2015; 4. "Best Damn Thing" Released: July 31, 2015

No Good is the first studio album by American singer Ivy Levan. The album was released on August 7, 2015, and featured the two official singles, "Biscuit" and "Killing You" featuring Sting.

== Background ==
No Good is Levan's debut studio album, following the releases of her two previous extended plays. The album follows her recent genre path: pop, swamp pop, pop rock, and blue-eyed soul.

== Singles ==
=== Official singles ===
The lead single for No Good was released on January 13, 2015. The track was titled "Biscuit" and its music video was released the same day.

The official second single from No Good was released on June 23, 2015, and was called "Killing You". The track features Sting.

=== Promotional singles ===
The album's first promotional single was released on December 2, 2014, and was titled "The Dame Says". The lyric video for the single was released earlier, on November 24.

The second promo single was released only on YouTube to the public on June 2, 2015, and it was entitled "27 Club". The track is a collaboration between Levan and Diplo."27 Club was later, on July 10, 2015, released for digital download.The cover-art for the second release pictured just Levan instead of both Levan and Diplo like it did in the audio version released on YouTube.

The third promotional single was released on July 24, 2015 and is titled "No Good". The track follows the album's general sound and genre. "Best Damn thing was also released soon after on July 31st as the fourth promotional single.

"Killing You", 27 Club", "No Good", and "Best Damn Thing" were all available with pre-order on iTunes.

== Track listing ==
Standard Edition
| No. | Title | Writer(s) | Producer(s) | Length |
|---|---|---|---|---|
| 1. | "The Dame Says" | Ivy Levan; Patrick Nissley; Lucas Banker | Nissley; Banker | 3:35 |
| 2. | "Biscuit" | Levan; Nissley; Banker | BloodMoney | 3:13 |
| 3. | "No Good" | Levan; Nissley; Banker; Tomo Milicevic | Nissley; Banker | 3:02 |
| 4. | "Champagne Taste" | Levan; Nissley; Banker | Nissley; Banker | 3:06 |
| 5. | "Like A Glove" (featuring Cadre) | Levan; Nissley; Banker | Nissley; Banker | 3:16 |
| 6. | "27 Club" (with Diplo) | Levan; Nissley; Banker; Thomas Wesley "Diplo" Pentz; Matthew Squire | Nissley; Banker; Diplo | 3:29 |
| 7. | "Best Damn Thing" | Levan; Nissley; Banker; Milicevic | Nissley; Banker | 2:59 |
| 8. | "Misery" | Levan; Nissley; Banker | Nissley; Banker | 2:57 |
| 9. | "Killing You" (featuring Sting) | Levan; Nissley; Banker; Gordon "Sting" Sumner | Nissley; Banker | 3:21 |
| 10. | "Johnny Boy" | Levan; Nissley; Banker | Nissley; Banker | 3:54 |
| 11. | "It Ain't Easy" | Levan; Nissley; Banker | Nissley; Banker | 3:14 |
| Total length: | | | | 36:06 |

== Charts ==
| Chart (2015) | Peak position |
|---|---|
| US Heatseeker Albums (Billboard) | 15 |
