= The Kill =

2006 single by Thirty Seconds to Mars

Single by Thirty Seconds to Mars

from the album A Beautiful Lie
- Written: 2003
- Released: January 24, 2006
- Genre: Emo; hard rock; alternative rock; post-hardcore
- Length: 3:52
- Label: Immortal; Virgin
- Songwriter: Jared Leto
- Producers: Josh Abraham; Thirty Seconds to Mars

Thirty Seconds to Mars singles chronology
"Attack" (2005)	"The Kill" (2006)	"From Yesterday" (2006)

"The Kill (Rebirth)"
- Artwork for the UK version of the single

Audio sample
- The Kill: file; help

Music video
- "The Kill" on YouTube

"The Kill" (written "The Kill (Bury Me)" on the single and music video) is a song by American band Thirty Seconds to Mars. The song was released on January 24, 2006, as the second single from their second album, A Beautiful Lie (2005). It was certified double platinum by the Recording Industry Association of America (RIAA) and peaked at number 65 on the Billboard Hot 100. In 2024, the staff of Consequence included the song in their list of "50 Kick-Butt Post-Grunge Songs We Can Get Behind".

== Overview ==
Jared Leto described the meaning of the song as, "It's really about a relationship with yourself. It's about confronting your fear and confronting the truth about who you are." He has also said it is about "confrontation as a crossroads" — coming face-to-face with who you really are.

In September 2007, "The Kill" was re-released again in the UK. It was also available as a Compact Disc with a A Beautiful Lie poster, two stickers, and a special limited edition 7" vinyl version. The song is played in 6/8 time.

Two alternate versions of the song exist: the "Rebirth" version, which adds in orchestral accompaniment and has no screaming, and an acoustic version featuring Brazilian singer Pitty that was only released in Brazil. On May 2, 2010, the band performed the song live with Chino Moreno from Deftones.

== Commercial performance ==
The song broke a record on the US Billboard Modern Rock Tracks chart by remaining on the chart for 52 weeks; however, the song never topped the chart, peaking at number three. Their next single, "From Yesterday", would be their first to reach the top but spent less time on the charts than "The Kill". The song crossed to the Billboard Hot 100, where it peaked at number 65.

== Music video ==
The video is a homage to the Stanley Kubrick's 1980 film The Shining based on the Stephen King novel. Several scenes are based on the film, such as when Shannon Leto enters Room 6277 and encounters the woman in the bathroom and another when Matt Wachter is served drinks at the bar by a doppelgänger apparition. The video culminates in an elegant ballroom in the same manner as the photo at the end of the film. At 2:07, the papers that Jared Leto has been typing are briefly made visible and the words on them appear to read, over and over, "This is who I really am." This is another allusion to The Shining, in which Jack Torrance types up pages and pages of the same line, "All work and no play makes Jack a dull boy", over and over in the same sense. The scene with a man in a bear costume, in a bedroom, is also from The Shining.

As for the cinematography, Jared Leto adopted the split screen visual from working with Darren Aronofsky in Requiem for a Dream.

The haunted room number is changed from 237 to 6277 in the video because it spells out "Mars" on a telephone keypad. The number also makes an appearance in the video for "From Yesterday" and "Up in the Air."

Scenes from the music video - top: Jared Leto confronting himself. Bottom: The band perform the song to the 1920s-themed audience.

The music video was selected as the greatest rock video in the Kerrang Rock 100 on June 27, 2009.

When the press release info for "The Kill" video was released, Jared stated that the video was directed by an albino Danish man named Bartholomew Cubbins. This was intended as a joke as Cubbins is the main character of the Dr. Seuss book The 500 Hats of Bartholomew Cubbins, however airings of the video on music channels still list Cubbins as the director. Bartholomew Cubbins has remained Jared Leto's alias for directing Thirty Seconds to Mars' videos (with the exception of the video for "A Beautiful Lie"). The hotel scenes in the video were filmed at The Carlu in Toronto, Ontario.

=== Plot ===
The music video is based on the movie The Shining. It features the band exploring a hotel which they are caretaking. At the start, Jared Leto states that they have the hotel all to themselves for three days; although, later on, after the first chorus, it comes on the screen saying "One Week Later", before showing the pages saying "This is who I really am". In the extended version of the video, the other band members complain that they have been at the hotel longer than expected and have canceled shows because of Jared's peculiar behavior, explaining the discrepancy.

A letter from the hotel owner tells the band to "Enjoy your stay and please stay out of Room 6277." Shannon Leto does not heed the warning and opens Room 6277. Following the opening of the door, each band member begins to experience the effects of the room opening throughout the hotel. Each member experiences the effects differently, but one thing remains constant for each individual – they encounter a version of themselves dressed in a 1920s style tuxedo with tails. Several other apparitions then take up residence in the hotel, dispelling the promise Jared made at the beginning of the video that the band will have the hotel all to themselves and that "there's not gonna be a single fucking soul". The video reaches its climax when Miličević encounters himself in bed with a man in a bear suit (another Shining reference), and immediately the band dressed in tuxedos are shown performing the song in the hotel's ballroom in front of a crowd of twins, dressed like the roaring 1920s, dancing with themselves. The theme of duality resonates throughout the video.

== Accolades ==
Accolades for "The Kill"
Publication	Country	Accolade	Year	Rank
AOL Radio	United States	"Top Alternative Songs of the Decade - 2000s"	2009	1

== Awards ==
- Won Best Single at the Kerrang! Awards 2007.
- On August 31, 2006, the band won the MTV2 Award for "The Kill" at the MTV Video Music Awards, one of their two nominations. The second nomination was for best rock video; however, they lost to AFI's "Miss Murder".
- "The Kill" was awarded Best Video of the Year and Best Rock Video at the MTV Australia Video Music Awards (AVMAs).
- Won 2006 fuse Fangoria Chainsaw Award for Best Video Inspired by a Movie.
- Won The Rock Out! Award at the 2007 MTV EMA's (Europe Music Awards).

== Track listings ==
Standard

1. "The Kill (Bury Me)" – 3:52
2. "Attack" (live at CBGB, July 2006) – 4:06
3. "The Kill (Bury Me)" (acoustic, live on VH1) – 3:48

UK release

1. "The Kill (Rebirth)" – 3:52
2. "The Kill (Rebirth)" (acoustic, live on VH1) – 3:48

UK re-release

1. "The Kill (Rebirth)" – 3:52
2. "Was It a Dream?" (iTunes live session) – 3:46

Brazil release

1. "The Kill (acoustic)" (featuring Pitty) – 3:44

== Personnel ==
- Jared Leto – vocals, guitar
- Tomo Miličević – guitar, programming
- Matt Wachter – bass, keyboards
- Shannon Leto – drums
- Matt Serletic – piano

== Charts ==
=== Weekly charts ===
Weekly chart performance for "The Kill"
Chart (2006–2007)	Peak position
Australia (ARIA)	20
Austria (Ö3 Austria Top 40)	39
Canada Rock (Billboard)	23
Czech Republic Airplay (ČNS IFPI)	46
Germany (GfK)	36
Netherlands (Single Top 100)	51
New Zealand (Recorded Music NZ)	22
Scottish Singles Sales (Official Charts)	28
Switzerland (Schweizer Hitparade)	52
UK Singles (Official Charts)	28
UK Airplay (Music Week)	21
US Billboard Hot 100	65
US Adult Pop Airplay (Billboard)	25
US Alternative Airplay (Billboard)	3
US Mainstream Rock Airplay (Billboard)	14
US Pop Airplay (Billboard)	30

=== Year-end charts ===
Year-end chart performance for "The Kill"
Chart (2006)	Position
US Modern Rock Tracks (Billboard)	3

== Certifications ==
Certifications and sales for "The Kill"
Region	Certification	Certified units/sales
Brazil (Pro-Música Brasil)	Platinum	60,000^{‡}
Germany (BVMI)	Gold	150,000^{‡}
Italy (FIMI)	Gold	50,000^{‡}
New Zealand (RMNZ)	2× Platinum	60,000^{‡}
United Kingdom (BPI)	Platinum	600,000^{‡}
United States (RIAA)	2× Platinum	2,000,000^{‡}
^{‡} Sales+streaming figures based on certification alone.

== Release history ==
Release dates and formats for "The Kill"
Region	Date	Format	Label(s)	Ref.
United States	August 14, 2006	Contemporary hit radio	Virgin	

== In popular culture ==
- The song is available as downloadable content for Rock Band.
