= Biscuit (game) =

Drinking game played with dice

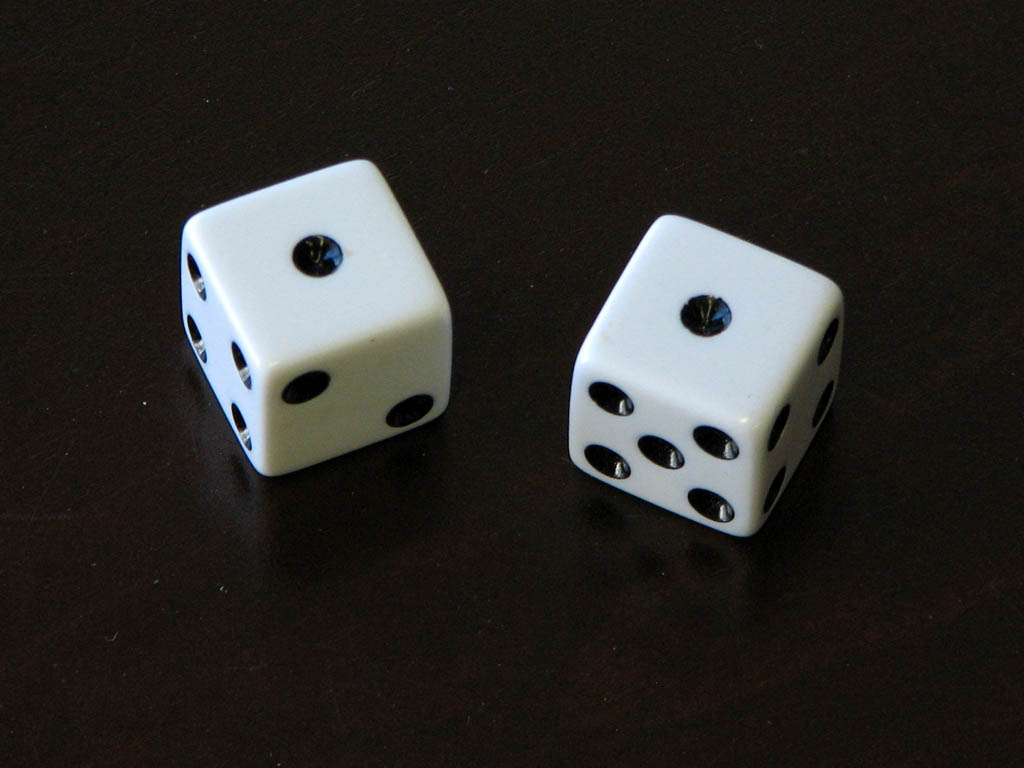
- When a pair of ones is rolled, all players must drink
- Genres: Drinking
- Players: 3+
- Playing time: Based on # of players and random chance

Biscuit (also referred to as Bizkit or Biskit) is a drinking game played with two dice.

== Rules ==
Each player rolls the dice one time. The first person to roll 7 becomes "The Biscuit". That player then rolls the dice, with the following results:

(one, one)
Everyone take a drink.
(six, six)
Roller has to invent a rule which will be applied for the rest of the game. Breaking this rule requires a penalty drink to be taken.
,,, (doubles)
Roller gives drinks to one or several players equal to the number on one of the dice rolled.
(total of 3)
Called a "challenge". Roller chooses a player, that player must roll the dice. Add the result of each dice. The first roller has to make a higher result. If the first roller wins, the chosen player has to drink the difference between the two results. If the first roller failed, he has to drink the difference.
,, (total of 7)
All players put a thumb on their forehead and say "Biscuit". Last player to do so drinks, and becomes the new "Biscuit".
, (total of 9)
Person to the right of the roller drinks.
(total of 10)
The roller drinks.
(total of 11)
Person to the left of the roller drinks.
(The number 3)
Whenever three appears on the dice, the "Biscuit" player has to take a drink. (If the dice show three and three, the player takes two drinks.) Having done so, they cease to be the Biscuit, and the game will have no Biscuit until 7 is rolled (or another rule nominates a Biscuit).

Having rolled, dice are then passed to the next player clockwise around the table.
