= Biscuit (song) =

Single by Ivy Levan

from the album No Good
- Released: January 13, 2015
- Genre: Pop
- Length: 3:13
- Label: Cherrytree; Interscope
- Songwriter(s): Ivy Rose Levan; Lucas Banker; Patrick Nissley; William Pounds

Ivy Levan singles chronology
"The Dame Says" (2014)	"Biscuit" (2015)	"Killing You" (2015)

"Biscuit" is a song performed by American recording artist Ivy Levan. It was written by Levan alongside Lucas Banker, William Pounds and Patrick Nissley, for her debut studio album, No Good. The song was released as the album's lead single on January 13, 2015 through Interscope Records. A music video for the song was released later the same day.

== Composition ==
Musically, "Biscuit" is a pop song in which Levan sings about kissing her "biscuit", which is a euphemism for her buttocks, derived from the Southern expression "butter my butt and call me a biscuit".

== Critical reception ==
Idolator praised the song, calling it " a refreshingly… different pop song with an instantly memorable chorus and lyrics that positively drip with sassy attitude".

== Music video ==
The music video premiered on January 13, 2015. It shows Levan in different frames. At first, she is seen stirring a cauldron like a witch. Then a puppet-like biscuit comes out from the pot, accompanying the singer in her choreography. At other times, Levan is shot in the foreground, first with round spectacles similar to those used by Lady Gaga in her video for "Paparazzi", then while she is wearing headphones and blowing bubbles of chewing gum.

== Track listings ==
- Digital download
1. "Biscuit" – 3:13
- Digital EP – Remixes
1. "Biscuit" (Dave Audé Remix) – 3:48
2. "Biscuit" (Wayne and Woods Remix) – 5:35
3. "Biscuit" (Top $helf Remix) – 3:22
4. "Biscuit" (Butter Butter Remix) – 3:38
5. "Biscuit" (Michael Teixeira Remix) – 3:07

== Charts ==
Chart (2015)	Peak position
US Dance Club Songs (Billboard)	5
