= A Beautiful Lie =

2006 studio album by 30 Seconds to Mars

- Original release cover. Various alternate covers have been used for re-issues.

Studio album by Thirty Seconds to Mars
- Released: August 30, 2005
- Recorded: 2004–2005
- Studios: Pulse Recording (Los Angeles, California); The Laboratory (Los Angeles, California); The Center for the Advancement of the Arts and Sciences of Sound (Alaska); Lionshead Studios (South Africa); Circle in the Square Studio (New York City)
- Genres: Alternative rock; hard rock; post-hardcore
- Length: 49:28
- Labels: Immortal; Virgin; EMI; Capitol
- Producers: Josh Abraham, Thirty Seconds to Mars

Thirty Seconds to Mars chronology
30 Seconds to Mars (2002)	A Beautiful Lie (2005)	AOL Sessions Undercover (2007)

Singles from A Beautiful Lie
- 1. "Attack" Released: May 3, 2005; 2. "The Kill" Released: January 24, 2006; 3. "From Yesterday" Released: October 17, 2006; 4. "A Beautiful Lie" Released: July 17, 2007

A Beautiful Lie is the second studio album by American rock band Thirty Seconds to Mars. The album was released on August 30, 2005, through Virgin Records. It was produced by Josh Abraham.

A Beautiful Lie differs notably from the band's self-titled debut album, both musically and lyrically. Whereas the eponymous concept album's lyrics focus on human struggle and astronomical themes, A Beautiful Lie's lyrics are "personal and less cerebral". It is the first to feature guitarist Tomo Miličević and the only one to feature bassist Matt Wachter, who left the band in 2007. The album produced four singles, "Attack", "The Kill", "From Yesterday", and "A Beautiful Lie"; of which three of those four singles managed to chart within the top 30 on the US Modern Rock chart, with "The Kill" and "From Yesterday" entering the top three.

A Beautiful Lie received positive reviews from music critics, many praising the album for diverging from the sound of the band's previous work. It has been stylistically described as post-hardcore, hard rock, and alternative rock. The success of the album had helped the band receive accolades for their singles such as "The Kill" and "From Yesterday".

== History ==
A Beautiful Lie was recorded on four continents in five countries over a three-year period to accommodate lead singer Jared Leto's acting career. The album's title track, as well as three other songs, were composed in Cape Town, South Africa, where Leto was later met by his bandmates to work on the tracks. It was during this time that Leto conceived the album's title. Prior to this, the album was tentatively to be released under the title Battle of One. It was leaked onto peer-to-peer file sharing networks almost five months before its scheduled release; the version of the album that leaked was unmastered. Because of this, the band was forced to set back the album's release date.

To promote A Beautiful Lie, Thirty Seconds to Mars included the songs "Battle of One" and "Hunter" (originally performed by Björk) as bonus tracks. "Golden passes" were also included with three of the special versions of the album that entitled the buyer free entrance and backstage access to any Thirty Seconds to Mars show for the rest of their formation.

The original 2005 release of the album included the hidden track "Praying for a Riot" inside the song "A Modern Myth". Later releases of the album dropped the song.

A Beautiful Lie sold 21,000 copies in its first week of release in the US and has gone on to sell more than 1.2 million copies in the US alone.

== Alternative versions ==
=== Deluxe edition ===
On November 26, 2006, a special edition of A Beautiful Lie was released and features different artwork, a third bonus track (all versions have at least two); the UK version of the song "The Kill" entitled "The Kill (Rebirth)", and a DVD that features the music video for "The Kill", the making of the video for "The Kill", live performances and MTV2 moments involving the band.

Before production of the Deluxe Edition, the band requested that the members of the "Echelon" send in their names so that they could be thanked for their support over the years. As a result, the inside cover(s) of the Deluxe Edition contain a large list of printed fan names. In addition to this, the front cover contains a lenticular image consisting of the Mithra (phoenix) and the Trinity (skulls).

=== 2007 re-release ===
A Beautiful Lie was re-released on November 26, 2007, following extensive touring throughout Europe, in an attempt to expose themselves to a larger audience. The re-release is essentially the same as the original release, although includes different artwork. The album was re-released in Ireland again in November 2007, the version contains the UK version of "The Kill" and a second bonus track, and an acoustic version of the song "A Beautiful Lie" recorded live on a radio session.

=== 20th anniversary deluxe edition ===
On January 14, 2026, the band started releasing cryptic teasers, believed to be related to the 20th anniversary edition of the album, which was teased at their 2025 Kia Forum anniversary show of the album. On January 23, 2026, the band released "God's Eye", a reworked demo from the album's original sessions, alongside CD and vinyl pre-orders for the album. And on February 27, 2026, the band released "Over My Head", another reworking of an album session demo.

== Critical reception ==
Professional ratings
Review scores
Source	Rating
AllMusic	2/5 stars
Alternative Addiction	3.5/5 stars
Billboard	favorable
Kerrang!	4/5 stars
Melodic	4/5 stars
Revolver	4/5
Rock Sound	6/10
Rolling Stone	2/5 stars
San Francisco Chronicle	4/5 stars
Sputnikmusic	3.5/5

A Beautiful Lie received generally positive reviews from music critics. Jon Wiederhorn from Revolver noted that "intensity and passion clearly inform the textural hard rock of A Beautiful Lie," which "boasts echoing riffs, moody bass lines, and strong vocal melodies that evoke a radio-friendly mix of Staind, Nine Inch Nails, U2, and The Cure." Jaan Uhelszki of the San Francisco Chronicle described the album as "full of ferocious electronics, overcaffeinated guitar lines and anxious drumming paired with brainy, brittle but emotionally austere lyrics." Nylon magazine called it "an album that is digestible without losing the rough-around-the-edges appeal that the band's rapidly expanding fan base crave." Alternative Addiction commented that the band recorded "an album with a handful of very impressive tracks," beginning with "Attack", the first song on the record, which "soars sonically with processing mixed and forceful vocals."

Christa L. Titus from Billboard felt that the band "proved its potency" with songs like "The Kill", "Was It a Dream?", and "From Yesterday", and praised Leto's vocal ability by writing, "[he] alternates between cathartic shouts and a tantalizing croon that shows his capable vocal range." Kaj Roth from Melodic praised the sonic variety and summarized the record as "an impressive list of anthemic rock songs." Davey Boy of Sputnikmusic echoed this sentiment, writing that A Beautiful Lie "works well as an album due to greater variety". He also found the record "a more controlled effort" than the band's debut album 30 Seconds to Mars (2002). Kerrang! magazine called it a "great album to close your eyes and fall in to, an anthemic eruption of upfront emotion."

In a mixed review, Stephen Thomas Erlewine from AllMusic wrote that the "band floats out of time, inspired heavily by '90s alt rock but too clean, heavy, and facile to truly be part of that tradition, yet too indebted to the past to sound like part of the 2000s, either." He found the band "capable enough at shifting from tense quiet verses to piledriving, heavy choruses, but they borrow the worst habits from all their favorite groups, and then assemble them in insufferably earnest fashion, playing clichés as if they were revelations." Christian Hoard of Rolling Stone stated, "[d]espite some credible modern-rock tunes, Leto's self-involved myopia guarantees that his band's second disc is long on melodrama."

=== Accolades ===
At the Billboard Music Awards, "The Kill" and "From Yesterday" were nominated in the category of Modern Rock Single of the Year in 2006 and 2007, respectively. In 2007, A Beautiful Lie was named Best Album by Rock on Request. Thirty Seconds to Mars received the Kerrang! Award for Best Single in two consecutive years for "The Kill" and "From Yesterday" in 2007 and 2008. Metal Edge ranked A Beautiful Lie one of the top 10 albums of 2005. Melodic included it among the best albums of the year. Alternative Addiction ranked it at number six on their list of 20 best albums of the year. In 2009, Kerrang! listed A Beautiful Lie at number four on their list of the 50 best albums of the decade. The album was included in Rock Sound's 101 Modern Classics list at number 78.

== Track listing ==
All tracks are written by Jared Leto, except where noted.

No.	Title	Writer(s)	Length
1.	"Attack"		3:09
2.	"A Beautiful Lie"		4:05
3.	"The Kill"		3:51
4.	"Was It a Dream?"		4:15
5.	"The Fantasy"		4:29
6.	"Savior"	J. Leto, Shannon Leto, Tomo Miličević, Matt Wachter	3:24 (Note: The digital version of the album cuts out the intro of this song, making it a length of 3:11.)
7.	"From Yesterday"	J. Leto, S. Leto, Miličević, Wachter	4:07
8.	"The Story"		3:55
9.	"R-Evolve"		3:59
10.	"A Modern Myth" (includes hidden track "Praying for a Riot")		14:14 (Note: Updated streaming versions do not include the hidden track and the length is 2:59.)
Total length:			49:28

Bonus tracks
No.	Title	Writer(s)	Length
11.	"Battle of One"	J. Leto, S. Leto, Miličević, Wachter	2:47
12.	"Hunter"	Björk Guðmundsdóttir	3:54
Total length:			56:09

A Beautiful Lie – Standard edition (iTunes Store bonus track)
No.	Title	Length
13.	"Attack" (Live)	5:03
Total length:		61:12

A Beautiful Lie – Standard edition (Brazil bonus tracks)
No.	Title	Writer(s)	Length
13.	"The Kill (Rebirth)"		3:40
14.	"The Kill" (featuring Pitty)	Jared Leto; Priscilla Leone	3:44
Total length:			63:33

A Beautiful Lie – Standard edition (Japan and Australia bonus track)
No.	Title	Length
13.	"Was It a Dream?" (Acoustic)	4:25
Total length:		60:34

A Beautiful Lie – Deluxe edition (US bonus track)
No.	Title	Length
13.	"The Kill (Rebirth)"	3:40
Total length:		59:49

A Beautiful Lie – Deluxe edition (US DVD)
No.	Title	Length
1.	"The Kill" (Music video)
2.	"The Kill" (Making-of)
3.	"The International Music Feed Interview"
4.	"Attack" (MTV2 Greatest Moments 2006)
5.	"The Kill" (MTV2 Greatest Moments 2006)
6.	"The Fantasy" (Fan-Generated Take) (MTV2 Greatest Moments 2006)
7.	"T-Minus Rock Interview" (MTV2 Greatest Moments 2006)
8.	"Red Carpet Arrival" (MTV Video Music Awards 2006)
9.	"MTV2 Award Acceptance Speech"
10.	"MTV2 $2Bill Internet Promo"
11.	"MTV2 $2Bill Pre-Sale Tour Promo"
12.	"MTV2 $2Bill Ticket Sale Tour Promo"

A Beautiful Lie – Deluxe edition (EU bonus tracks)
No.	Title	Length
13.	"The Kill (Rebirth)"	3:40
14.	"A Beautiful Lie" (Acoustic)	3:42
Total length:		63:31

A Beautiful Lie – Deluxe edition (EU DVD)
No.	Title	Length
1.	"The Kill" (Music video)
2.	"The Kill" (Making-of)
3.	"From Yesterday" (Music video)
4.	"From Yesterday" (Behind-the-scenes)
5.	"A Beautiful Lie" (Behind-the-scenes)
6.	"The International Music Feed Interview"
7.	"Attack" (MTV2's All That Rocks)
8.	"The Kill" (MTV2's All That Rocks)
9.	"The Fantasy" (Fan-Generated Take) (MTV2's All That Rocks)

A Beautiful Lie – 20th anniversary edition (bonus tracks)
No.	Title	Writer(s)	Length
13.	"God's Eye"	J. Leto, Stevie Aiello	2:11
14.	"Over My Head"		2:21
15.	"The Glory"		3:21
16.	"The Kill" (acoustic version)		3:26
Total length:			58:55 (Note: This version does not include the hidden song, "Praying for a Riot".)

== Credits and personnel ==
Credits adapted from A Beautiful Lie album liner notes and Apple Music.

Thirty Seconds to Mars

- Jared Leto – vocals, rhythm guitar
- Tomo Miličević – lead guitar, synthesizers, programming
- Matt Wachter – bass guitar, keyboards
- Shannon Leto – drums, percussion

Additional musicians

- Miguel Atwood-Ferguson – viola (10)
- Caroline Campbell – violin (10)
- Steve Dress – strings contractor and double bass (10)
- Vanessa Freebairn-Smith – cello (10)
- Oliver Goldstein – additional synthesizer (1, 6–7)
- Neel Hammond – violin (10)
- Wataru Hokoyama – string arrangement (10)
- Jeremy Rubolino – programming (12)
- Matt Serletic – piano (3)
- Stevie Aiello – guitar, background vocals (13, 14)
- Valentino Aiello – tambourine (13)

Production

- Josh Abraham – production (1–10)
- Thirty Seconds to Mars – production; creative direction and design
- Brian Virtue – production (3, 11–12); additional engineering; mixing and engineering (11–16)
- Stevie Aiello – production (13, 14, 16)
- Ryan Williams – engineering; mixing
- Brandon Belsky – assistant engineer
- Tom Lord-Alge – mixing (1)
- Oscar Neidhart – mixing engineer (13–16)
- Femio Hernandez – mixing assistant
- Dave Riley – assistant engineer
- Sean Geyer – assistant engineer
- Joe Bozzi – mastering engineer (13–16)
- Brian Gardner – mastering
- Sean Mosher-Smith – creative direction and design
- Olaf Heine – photography
- Gary Stiffelman – legal
- Irving Azoff – management
- Dian Vaughn – business management

== Charts ==
=== Weekly charts ===
Chart (2005–08, 2011, 2026)	Peak position
Argentine Albums (CAPIF)	6
Australian Albums (ARIA)	20
Austrian Albums (Ö3 Austria)	10
Belgian Albums (Ultratop Wallonia)	96
Czech Albums (ČNS IFPI)	35
Dutch Albums (Album Top 100)	31
Finnish Albums (Suomen virallinen lista)	15
French Albums (SNEP)	87
German Albums (Offizielle Top 100)	14
German Rock & Metal Albums (Offizielle Top 100)	5
Greek Albums (IFPI)	40
Irish Albums (IRMA)	76
Italian Albums (FIMI)	11
Mexican Albums (Top 100 Mexico)	20
New Zealand Albums (RMNZ)	20
Portuguese Albums (AFP)	23
Scottish Albums (OCC)	39
Swiss Albums (Schweizer Hitparade)	49
UK Albums (Official Charts)	38
US Billboard 200	36
US Top Rock Albums (Billboard)	9

=== Year-end charts ===
Chart (2006)	Position
US Billboard 200	184
Chart (2007)	Position
Austrian Albums (Ö3 Austria)	72
Italian Albums (FIMI)	63
UK Albums (OCC)	151
US Billboard 200	84
US Top Rock Albums (Billboard)	20

== Certifications ==
Region	Certification	Certified units/sales
Australia (ARIA)	Gold	35,000^{^}
Canada (Music Canada)	Gold	50,000^{^}
Germany (BVMI)	Platinum	200,000^{‡}
Italy (FIMI)	Platinum	80,000^{*}
Italy (FIMI) sales since 2009	Gold	25,000^{*}
New Zealand (RMNZ)	Platinum	15,000^{‡}
South Africa (RISA)	Gold	20,000^{*}
United Kingdom (BPI)	Platinum	300,000^{‡}
United States (RIAA)	Platinum	1,200,000
^{*} Sales figures based on certification alone.^{^} Shipments figures based on certification alone.^{‡} Sales+streaming figures based on certification alone.

== Release history ==
Release history and formats for A Beautiful Lie
Region	Date	Format	Version	Label
United States	August 30, 2005	CD; LP; digital download	Standard	Immortal, Virgin
Canada	August 30, 2005	CD; LP; digital download	Standard	EMI
Japan	December 7, 2005	CD; digital download	Standard	EMI
Australia	November 11, 2006	CD; digital download	Standard	Virgin, EMI
Italy	February 14, 2007	CD; digital download	Standard	EMI
Austria	February 15, 2007	CD; digital download	Standard	EMI
Germany	February 15, 2007	CD; digital download	Standard	EMI
Netherlands	February 16, 2007	CD; digital download	Standard	EMI
United Kingdom	February 26, 2007	CD; LP; digital download	Standard	Virgin
New Zealand	March 27, 2007	CD; digital download	Standard	EMI
Worldwide	March 27, 2026	Digital download; streaming	20th anniversary	Capitol Records
Worldwide	May 15, 2026	CD; LP	20th anniversary	Capitol Records
