= A Beautiful Lie (song) =

Single by Thirty Seconds to Mars

from the album A Beautiful Lie
- Released: July 17, 2007
- Recorded: 2004–2005
- Length: 4:05
- Label: Virgin
- Songwriter: Jared Leto
- Producer: Josh Abraham

Thirty Seconds to Mars singles chronology
"From Yesterday" (2006)	"A Beautiful Lie" (2007)	"Kings and Queens" (2009)

Music video
- "A Beautiful Lie" on YouTube

"A Beautiful Lie" is a song by American rock band Thirty Seconds to Mars. The song was released as the fourth single from their second album A Beautiful Lie (2005). It was not released in the United Kingdom as a single.

== History ==
On May 2, 2007, this was officially announced on the 30 Seconds to Mars official website, but not before checking the preference of the "Echelon". The band could not decide between "A Beautiful Lie" and "The Fantasy"; both songs contain a strong message which the band wished to deliver.

The song impacted radio on July 17, 2007. It did chart at number 37 on the US Modern Rock charts in late 2007. This was due to the song receiving substantial radio airplay.

Though initially released during the summer, the release date of the song had been pushed back to early 2008, possibly due to the long delay of the music video.

== Music video ==
According to EMI Japan, the video for "A Beautiful Lie" was going to be shot in both Alaska and the North Pole. Jared Leto then moved the video to Greenland and Iceland. The video for "A Beautiful Lie" was shot in August 2007 in Greenland. Jared said that the video will be environmentally safe and for every download of the video, it will go to an environmental charity. Jared Leto said on an over-the-phone interview with 99X in Atlanta that the video would be like a short film and a documentary.

On 28 January it was aired through MySpace and on MTV. The video shows the importance of global warming. The video was directed by Angakok Panipaq (a pseudonym for Leto based on a character from the Inuit children's book Spirits in the Snowhouse: The Inuit Angakok). The video features hidden frames of coal emissions into the environment, dead animals and a cemetery of white crosses. A link for the global warming support website abeautifullie.org is given at the end of the video.

The music video was shown through Rock Sound Magazine's website and MySpaceTV.

The video is a montage of images of the Greenland environment interwoven with scenes of the band playing on the edge of an iceberg.

=== Delays ===
On November 6, 2007, it was revealed that the video would premiere on Yahoo! Music Premieres on November 12, 2007. Later, it was postponed for extra editing time to December 3, 2007. Then, it was announced that the video would premiere on December 5, 2007. Later, it was postponed again, and it was said the video would air sometime after Christmas according to MTV with a special "making of" of the music video aired on December 30.

The Yahoo! Music Premieres then announced that the video would be aired on January 16, 2008, but soon after the video was removed from the list of upcoming premieres.

After months of delay due to heavy editing, the video finally premiered on MySpace on January 30, 2008, and aired on FUSE on January 31, 2008.

== Track listing ==
Standard

1. "A Beautiful Lie" (Single Shot) – 4:05
2. "A Beautiful Lie" (Half Caf) – 3:50

U.S.

1. "A Beautiful Lie" (Single Shot) – 4:05
2. "A Beautiful Lie" – 3:40 (live acoustic version)

EP version

1. "A Beautiful Lie" (Half Caf) – 3:50
2. "A Beautiful Lie" – 4:05
3. "A Beautiful Lie" (Acoustic) – 3:41
4. "Attack" (Live at CBGB) – 4:14

== Charts ==
Chart performance for "A Beautiful Lie"
Chart (2007–08)	Peak position
Czech Republic Airplay (ČNS IFPI)	73
Germany (GfK)	92
US Alternative Airplay (Billboard)	37

== Personnel ==
- Jared Leto – vocals, guitar
- Tomo Miličević – guitar, programming
- Matt Wachter – bass guitar, keyboard, synthesizers (does not appear in music video)
- Shannon Leto – drums
