= Tomo Miličević =

American musician (born 1979)

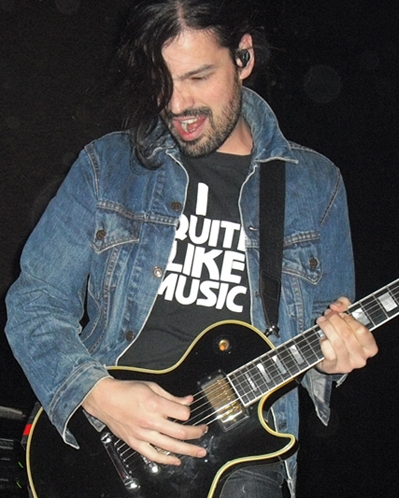
- Miličević performing in Baton Rouge, Louisiana in February 2010
- Born: September 3, 1979 (age 47); Sarajevo, SR Bosnia and Herzegovina, Yugoslavia
- Occupations: Musician; songwriter; record producer
- Spouse: Vicki Bosanko (m. 2011; div. 2021) Julia Miličević (m. 2024)
- Family: Ivana Miličević (sister)
- Musical career
- Genre: Alternative rock
- Instruments: Guitar; bass guitar; violin; keyboards; percussion
- Labels: Interscope; Universal; Virgin; EMI; Immortal
- Formerly of: Thirty Seconds to Mars

Tomislav "Tomo" Miličević (pronounced [tǒːmo milǐːt͡ʃevit͡ɕ]; born September 3, 1979) is a Croatian-American musician and record producer. He was the lead guitarist of the rock band Thirty Seconds to Mars from 2003 to 2018. Born in Sarajevo but raised in the United States, Miličević moved to Troy, Michigan, in the early 1980s, where he became active in the local heavy metal scene and played in a number of bands, co-founding Morphic. In 2003, he joined Thirty Seconds to Mars, with whom he achieved worldwide recognition in the mid-2000s after recording the band's second album A Beautiful Lie (2005). Its full-length follow-ups, This Is War (2009) and Love, Lust, Faith and Dreams (2013), received further critical and commercial success.

Miličević has also worked as a collaborator and music producer. Throughout the 2010s, he was featured on a recording with Dommin and collaborated with Ivy Levan on a number of releases, including Introducing the Dame (2013) and No Good (2015). Miličević has experimented with various guitar effects and introduced influences from several genres of music into his own style.

== Early life and education ==
Tomo Miličević was born on September 3, 1979, in Sarajevo, Bosnia and Herzegovina, then part of SFR Yugoslavia, to a Bosnian Croat family. He is the middle child of Tonka and Damir Miličević. He has an elder sister, Ivana, and a younger brother, Filip. His father worked in agricultural engineering and his mother was a doctor. His family first arrived in the United States in 1982, where Miličević's brother Filip was born. They traveled back and forth until they permanently emigrated to Troy, Michigan, when Miličević enrolled in the third grade. After moving to the United States, both his parents worked in manufacturing industries in Troy and Detroit. A few years later, they started their own business.

Miličević became interested in classical music at early age, when he started to take violin lessons inspired by his uncle Željko "Bill" Miličević, a virtuoso violinist and professor of music at Oakland University in Rochester, Michigan. "I was actually born and bred to be a concert violinist", he explained. Miličević's introduction to the world of heavy metal music was around the age of 11. His parents supported his decision to start playing guitar, so he and his father made one together. He began writing his own music in high school, while at the same time performing in a number of local bands.

Miličević gained American citizenship in the early 1990s. He attended culinary school at Oakland Community College, becoming a certified executive and pastry chef, and worked in a number of restaurants in Metro Detroit. He graduated from Athens High School in Troy and then moved to Los Angeles, rejoining his siblings Ivana and Filip. The three later convinced their parents to leave Troy and resettle in Los Angeles, where they opened a restaurant.

== Career ==
Miličević began playing in bands around Troy in the late 1990s. He co-founded the group Morphic with some friends in 2000. The band first operated under the name Loki, before settling on its final name. By 2001, the group performed gigs at small Michigan venues and clubs, and recorded a number of demo tracks. The following year, Miličević left the band and was almost ready to quit his musical career. However, during this period, manager Arthur Spivak, who had previously met Miličević at a showcase concert with Morphic, told him about an audition for Thirty Seconds to Mars. Miličević then decided to move to Los Angeles where he had a successful audition with Thirty Seconds to Mars, replacing guitarist Solon Bixler. By 2003, the band consisted of Miličević, lead vocalist and rhythm guitarist Jared Leto, drummer Shannon Leto, and bassist Matt Wachter. The new lineup debuted on The Late Late Show with Craig Kilborn in February 2003.

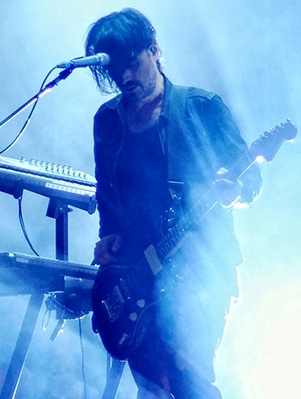
Miličević performing in Padova, Italy, in July 2013

Thirty Seconds to Mars entered the studio in March 2004 to begin working on their second album A Beautiful Lie. The recording process saw the band traveling to four different continents to accommodate Jared Leto's acting career. A Beautiful Lie was released on August 30, 2005, in the United States. Fueled by the band's relentless touring and the mainstream success of the single "The Kill", the album received multiple certifications all over the world, including platinum in the United States, with a worldwide sales total of over four million. The album tour saw the band playing at several major festivals, including Roskilde, Pinkpop, Rock am Ring, and Download.

In August 2008, during the recording process of the band's third studio album, Thirty Seconds to Mars attempted to sign with a new label, prompting EMI (the parent label of Virgin), to file a $30 million breach of contract lawsuit. After nearly a year of legal battles, the band announced on April 28, 2009, that the suit had been settled following a defense based on the De Havilland Law. Thirty Seconds to Mars then signed a new contract with EMI and released their third album This Is War in December 2009 to critical acclaim.

This Is War reached the top ten of several national album charts and earned numerous music awards. The band began their Into the Wild Tour in support of the record in February 2010 and was among the hardest-working touring artists of the year. In December 2011, they entered the Guinness World Records for most live shows during a single album cycle, with 300 shows. Miličević collaborated with American band Dommin on a rendition of Cutting Crew's song "(I Just) Died in Your Arms", which was released on a special edition of Dommin's album Love Is Gone (2010). He began producing American singer Ivy Levan in 2012. After signing to Cherrytree Records, Levan released the EP Introducing the Dame (2013), which features a collaboration with Miličević, who wrote and produced a number of tracks.

Thirty Seconds to Mars released their fourth album, Love, Lust, Faith and Dreams, in May 2013 through Universal. It received generally positive reviews and reached the top ten in more than fifteen countries, including the United Kingdom and the United States. The band promoted the album by embarking on their Love, Lust, Faith and Dreams Tour and the Carnivores Tour, co-headlining with Linkin Park. In April 2014, Thirty Seconds to Mars announced that they have parted from Virgin Records after tumultuous years with the label. The following year, Miličević engineered Ivy Levan's debut album No Good alongside Patrick Nissley. He also wrote and performed on selected tracks. Thirty Seconds to Mars released their fifth album, America, in April 2018 through Interscope. During the Monolith Tour in support of the album, it was announced that Miličević would be taking a break from touring due to personal matters. In June 2018, he officially announced his departure from the band.

On August 16 2025, Tomo joined Thirty Seconds to Mars on stage at the Kia Forum celebrating 20 years of A Beautiful Lie for a handful of songs that were played from the album.

On April 15 2026 it was announced that Tomo would be reuniting with Thirty Seconds To Mars for their 2027 A Beautiful Lie VS This Is War European Tour.

== Artistry ==
Miličević is a classically trained musician who began his musical education at a very early age, playing the violin. During his youth, he had been influenced by jazz and classical music, listening to performers such as Stéphane Grappelli, John McLaughlin, Paco de Lucía, and Al Di Meola. His own ethnic background, and the diverse social and cultural mix in and around Detroit, were crucial in the formation of Miličević as a musician. He developed his interest in guitar from the moment he was introduced to heavy metal music, becoming a devoted fan of bands such as Pantera, Metallica, and Slayer. When he started writing his own music, Miličević regarded Pantera's album Vulgar Display of Power as a particularly influential record. He was further drawn into guitar when he realized the "genius" of emotions and passions which characterizes the common songwriting of rock music. Miličević explained, "All of the music that I have ever listened to, in some shape or form, has inspired me to do music". He grew up listening to progressive rock and blues artists, citing Jimi Hendrix, Pink Floyd, and Led Zeppelin. His major influences also include alternative rock bands such as Nirvana and The Smashing Pumpkins. He is inspired by electronic music, including The Cure and Depeche Mode.

Miličević explained that when making music his passion for the creative process is what drives his works and allows to constantly reinvent his style. Rod Lockwood from The Blade described his work as "propulsive and energetic, with a big, anthemic sound that draws on U2, The Cure, and classic rock for its aural infrastructure". Artistdirect complimented the "beautifully complex guitars" featured on the album A Beautiful Lie. A writer from the Chicago Music Guide commended the "imaginative effects" on This Is War, while Guitar Edge stated that the guitar work on the album is "in a class of its own", noticing "rich atmospheres" and "masterful guitar tone". Miličević experimented with different instruments and drew influences from a varied range of styles in Love, Lust, Faith and Dreams. In addition to the guitar and violin, Miličević is also a fluent player of bass instruments, keyboards and percussion, and supplies backing vocals during concerts.

== Personal life and Philanthropy ==
Miličević's immediate family includes his sister, actress Ivana, and his late brother, photographer Filip. He is a nephew of Željko "Bill" Miličević, professor of music at Oakland University in Rochester, Michigan. Miličević married his longtime girlfriend Vicki Bosanko in Crete, Greece in July 2011; they later divorced in 2022. Tomo then married his girlfriend Julia in 2024. After living in Los Angeles for over a decade, Miličević came back to Michigan in August 2014, moving to Indian Village in Detroit with his wife. He described himself as a "Michigan kid" who grew up with the music scene of Detroit. He also explained to have a "deep-rooted affinity" for the city.

Miličević lives a vegan lifestyle and supports animal rights. He worked with the Best Friends Animal Society on a number of programs. In the 2008 presidential election, Miličević supported Senator Barack Obama of Illinois. In June 2008, he joined Habitat for Humanity to work with Thirty Seconds to Mars on a home being repaired and renovated through the Greater Los Angeles Area's "A Brush With Kindness" programme.

== Discography ==
Studio albums with Thirty Seconds to Mars

- A Beautiful Lie (2005)
- This Is War (2009)
- Love, Lust, Faith and Dreams (2013)
- America (2018)
