= Avalanche (Thirty Seconds to Mars song) =

Promotional single by Thirty Seconds to Mars

from the album It's the End of the World but It's a Beautiful Day
- Released: January 19, 2024
- Recorded: The International Centre for the Advancement of the Arts and Sciences of Sound (Los Angeles, California)
- Genre: Electronic rock; alternative rock; dance-rock
- Length: 3:24
- Label: Concord
- Songwriters: Jared Leto; Shannon Leto
- Producers: Thirty Seconds to Mars; Oak; Oscar Neidhardt

"Avalanche" is a song by American rock band Thirty Seconds to Mars, featured on their sixth studio album It's the End of the World but It's a Beautiful Day (2023).

Although not released as a single, the song was serviced to adult contemporary radio in select markets on January 19, 2024, through Concord Records.

== Background ==
"Avalanche" was written by band members Jared and Shannon Leto and produced by the two alongside Oak Felder and Oscar Neidhardt. It was recorded at the International Centre for the Advancement of the Arts and Sciences of Sound in Los Angeles. The song was mixed by Rob Kinelski, who had previously worked with the band on their fifth studio album, America (2018), and was mastered by Mike Bozzi. It was revealed that it was one of the oldest songs written for It's the End of the World but It's a Beautiful Day.

The song blends electronic textures with percussive elements and layered vocal melodies, resulting in a sound that has been described as both anthemic and danceable. According to Songbpm.com, it is composed in the key of D major and has a tempo of 159 beats per minute. Lyrically, the song explores themes of survival, transformation, and defiance, with the central metaphor of an avalanche being used to evoke the idea of being overwhelmed by external or internal forces.

== Release ==
Despite not being released as a commercial single, "Avalanche" was sent to adult contemporary radio in select regions on January 19, 2024, serving as the only promotional single from It's the End of the World but It's a Beautiful Day. Its release coincided with the European leg of the band's Seasons Tour. The radio monitoring service EarOne listed the track as the seventh most-played song on modern rock radio in 2024 in Italy.

== Music video ==
A music video for the song premiered on YouTube on September 5, 2025, marking the second anniversary of the album's release. Directed by Fredrik Jonsson, the video was produced almost entirely using AI-generated imagery.

== Reception ==
"Avalanche" has been positively received by critics and is frequently mentioned as a standout track on the album. Isabella Miller, writing for Clash, referred to the song as a fitting conclusion to the album, citing the combination of dynamic percussion, soaring melodies, and Leto's vocals. Steven Loftin from The Line of Best Fit, in a mixed review of the album, described "Avalanche" as one of the tracks that fully realize the band's artistic intentions on the album, calling it a compelling fusion of their signature grandiosity with modern electronic elements. Nick Russell's Kerrang! noted that the track echoes earlier works such as "Closer to the Edge", albeit with a more electronic-driven sound.

== Charts ==
Chart (2024)	Peak position
Italy (Radio Top 40)	22
Italy Rock Airplay (FIMI)	1
