= Seasons (Thirty Seconds to Mars song) =

Single by Thirty Seconds to Mars

from the album It's the End of the World but It's a Beautiful Day
- Released: September 22, 2023
- Recorded: The International Centre for the Advancement of the Arts and Sciences of Sound (Los Angeles, California)
- Length: 2:46
- Label: Concord
- Songwriters: Jared Leto; Shannon Leto; Sam Martin; Johnny Goldstein; Connor McDonough; Riley McDonough; Nate Merchant
- Producers: Jared Leto; Shannon Leto; Connor McDonough; Riley McDonough; Johnny Goldstein

Thirty Seconds to Mars singles chronology
| "Stuck" (2023) | "Seasons" (2023) | "World on Fire" (2024) |

"Seasons" is a song by American rock band Thirty Seconds to Mars, featured on their sixth studio album It's the End of the World but It's a Beautiful Day (2023).

"Seasons" was released on September 22, 2023, through Concord Records, as the second single from the album.

== Background ==
"Seasons" was written by Jared and Shannon Leto, with additional contributions from Johnny Goldstein, Connor McDonough and Riley McDonough, who all produced the song. It was recorded at the International Centre for the Advancement of the Arts and Sciences of Sound in Los Angeles, California. Thirty Seconds to Mars premiered the song at Lollapalooza on August 1, 2023.

On September 15, 2023, it was announced that "Seasons" would be the second single from Thirty Seconds to Mars' sixth studio album It's the End of the World but It's a Beautiful Day.

== Composition ==
Leto described "Seasons" as a song "about watching life unfold and sharing that with people you care about". Robin Murray from Clash magazine called it "direct and infectious", stating that it "bristles with light and colour, an imaginative return that interprets their sound from fresh angles". Nicole Otero from Euphoria magazine felt that it "captures a sonic evolution that's hard to pin down but impossible to ignore" with its "rhythmic pulse" and "shimmering tones", describing the track as "captivating, unpredictable, and deeply evocative".

Brenton Harris from Maniacs commented that the song "asks if we can accept change as we move through the many different seasons of life", with the band "venturing unashamedly towards pure pop songcraft and production".

== Charts ==
Chart performance for "Seasons"
| Chart (2023–24) | Peak position |
|---|---|
| Austria (Austrian Airplay Top 50) | 6 |
| Canada Hot AC (Billboard) | 36 |
| Czech Republic Airplay (ČNS IFPI) | 9 |
| Germany (Offizielle Deutsche Airplay) | 2 |
| Italy (Radio Top 40) | 27 |
| Poland (Polish Airplay Top 100) | 12 |
| San Marino (SMRRTV Top 50) | 21 |
| Slovakia Airplay (ČNS IFPI) | 2 |
| Switzerland (Swiss Airplay) | 15 |
| US Adult Contemporary (Billboard) | 27 |
| US Adult Pop Airplay (Billboard) | 11 |
| US Hot Rock & Alternative Songs (Billboard) | 33 |
| US Pop Airplay (Billboard) | 19 |
