= Stuck (Thirty Seconds to Mars song) =

Single by Thirty Seconds to Mars

from the album It's the End of the World but It's a Beautiful Day
- Released: May 8, 2023
- Recorded: The International Centre for the Advancement of the Arts and Sciences of Sound (Los Angeles, California)
- Genre: Electropop
- Length: 3:02
- Label: Concord
- Songwriter: Jared Leto
- Producers: Jared Leto; Shannon Leto

Thirty Seconds to Mars singles chronology
"Rescue Me" (2018)	"Stuck" (2023)	"Seasons" (2023)

Music video
- "Stuck" on YouTube

"Stuck" is a song by American rock band Thirty Seconds to Mars, featured on their sixth studio album It's the End of the World but It's a Beautiful Day (2023).

"Stuck" was released on May 8, 2023 through Concord Records, as the lead single from the album, and the first single released by the band in 5 years.

== Background ==
The band shared a teaser of a new song titled "Stuck" with a 14-second grayscale preview clip on May 5, 2023. The "powerful, high-energy track" was released as the lead single on May 8, 2023, with an accompanying music video directed by Jared Leto himself. To Leto, song and video signify "a celebration of art, design, fashion, and the remarkable people who bring them to life". Release of the song was accompanied by the announcement of the album, their first in over five years. It was made available for pre-order in various CD and vinyl editions.

== Release ==
On May 8, Thirty Seconds to Mars released "Stuck", as the lead single from their upcoming sixth studio album, It's the End of the World but It's a Beautiful Day, which will be released on September 15.

== Accolades ==
Awards and nominations for "Stuck"
Organization	Year	Category	Result	Ref.
MTV Video Music Awards	2023	Best Alternative	Nominated	

== Charts ==
=== Weekly charts ===
Weekly chart performance for "Stuck"
Chart (2023)	Peak position
Belarus (TopHit)	4
Canada Digital Songs (Billboard)	42
Canada Rock (Billboard)	31
Czech Republic Airplay (ČNS IFPI)	49
Estonia (TopHit)	6
Germany Rock Airplay (GfK)	22
Italy (Radio Top 40)	10
Latvia (TopHit)	25
Netherlands (Dutch Top 40)	63
Poland (Polish Airplay Top 100)	26
Russia Airplay (TopHit)	6
San Marino (SMRRTV Top 50)	11
UK Singles Downloads (OCC)	69
UK Singles Sales (OCC)	70
US Hot Rock & Alternative Songs (Billboard)	30
US Rock & Alternative Airplay (Billboard)	8

=== Year-end charts ===
Year-end chart performance for "Stuck"
Chart (2023)	Position
Belarus Airplay (TopHit)	36
Kazakhstan Airplay (TopHit)	47
Russia Airplay (TopHit)	33
US Rock Airplay (Billboard)	28

Chart (2024)	Position
Belarus Airplay (TopHit)	102
Kazakhstan Airplay (TopHit)	138
