= Rescue Me (Thirty Seconds to Mars song) =

Single by Thirty Seconds to Mars

from the album America
- Released: June 15, 2018
- Recorded: The International Centre for the Advancement of the Arts and Sciences of Sound (Los Angeles, California)
- Genre: Electronic rock; dance-rock
- Length: 3:37
- Label: Interscope
- Songwriters: Jared Leto; Graham Muron
- Producers: KillaGraham; Jared Leto

Thirty Seconds to Mars singles chronology
"Dangerous Night" (2018)	"Rescue Me" (2018)	"Stuck" (2023)

Music video
- "Rescue Me" on YouTube

"Rescue Me" is a song by American rock band Thirty Seconds to Mars, featured on their fifth studio album America (2018). It was written and produced by Jared Leto and KillaGraham. "Rescue Me" was described as a song exploring themes such as pain, empowerment, faith, and freedom. Critics acknowledged eclectic influences that resonate throughout the track, including elements from dance-rock.

"Rescue Me" was released on June 15, 2018 through Interscope Records, as the third single from the album.

== Background ==
"Rescue Me" was written and produced by lead vocalist Jared Leto and music producer KillaGraham. It was engineered by Chris Galland and mixed by Manny Marroquin with the assistance of Scott Desmarais and Robin Florent. The song was recorded at The International Centre for the Advancement of the Arts and Sciences of Sound in Los Angeles, California and mastered by Howie Weinberg and Will Borza at Howie Weinberg Mastering. "Rescue Me" was officially revealed on March 22, 2018, at a press release for the announcement of the band's fifth album America. The band premiered the song on Vevo on March 30, 2018, one week before the album's release. An earlier version of the song is performed by Jared Leto in the documentary film Artifact (2012).

Jared Leto explained that the lyrics of the song explore themes such as pain, empowerment, faith, and freedom. He further called it a song about "the brutal war so many of us wage against fear, depression and anxiety in the hope that we might, one day, live a life filled with happiness and dreams". Camille Heimbrod from Music Times felt that the song is "all about a person's plea to be saved from the demons in his head". Will Lavin from Joe acknowledged eclectic influences that resonated throughout the track, featuring elements from genres as varied as rock, pop and dance music. Alex Lai from Contactmusic commented that "beats, samples and electronics" provides the backdrop to Leto's "unmistakeable" vocals.

== Music video ==
A music video for the song was directed by Mark Romanek and premiered on June 12, 2018 on MTV. "Rescue Me" is the first video by Thirty Seconds to Mars that was not directed by Jared Leto since "This Is War" (2011). It was released after lead guitarist Tomo Miličević announced his departure from the band. The music video opens with close-up shots of various people of multiple races, ages and abilities, featured against a black background. Throughout the video, each person displays vulnerability through their emotions and feelings. The clip includes appearances from Paris Jackson, Sofia Boutella, Arrow de Wilde from Starcrawler, and one-handed model Julian W. Lucas.

Brent Furdyk from Entertainment Tonight Canada lauded the simplicity of the video and wrote that it "runs the gamut of emotions". A Kerrang! writer noted that it addresses mental health issues. Mackenzie Cummings-Grady from Billboard called it "visceral", while Joe Divita of Loudwire referred to it as "powerful". A Malay Mail writer considered it as "a message of hope for those suffering from emotional pain".

== Live performances ==
"Rescue Me" was included in the setlist of the band's Monolith Tour. On May 27, 2018, the band was joined on stage by Shawn Mendes to perform the song at BBC Music's Biggest Weekend. Jon O'Brien, writing for Metro, deemed the performance a highlight of the festival. Thirty Seconds to Mars performed the song at Rock am Ring and Rock im Park in June 2018, which saw the band playing as headline act.

== Charts ==
Chart performance for "Rescue Me"
Chart (2018–19)	Peak position
Argentina (Argentina Hot 100)	92
Belgium (Ultratip Bubbling Under Wallonia)	42
Croatia Airplay (HRT)	79
Czech Republic (Rádio Top 100)	53
Italy (Radio Top 40)	14
Slovakia (Rádio Top 100)	53
Ukraine Airplay (TopHit)	30
US Hot Rock & Alternative Songs (Billboard)	31
US Rock & Alternative Airplay (Billboard)	29

== Certifications ==
Certifications for "Rescue Me"
Region	Certification	Certified units/sales
Brazil (Pro-Música Brasil)	Gold	20,000^{‡}
^{‡} Sales+streaming figures based on certification alone.
