= World on Fire (Thirty Seconds to Mars song) =

Single by Thirty Seconds to Mars

from the album It's the End of the World but It's a Beautiful Day
- Released: April 26, 2024
- Recorded: The International Centre for the Advancement of the Arts and Sciences of Sound (Los Angeles, California)
- Length: 3:17
- Label: Concord
- Songwriters: Jared Leto; Shannon Leto; Steve McCutcheon; Johnny McDaid; Ed Sheeran
- Producers: Jared Leto; Shannon Leto; Steve McCutcheon; Johnny McDaid; Oscar Neidhardt

Thirty Seconds to Mars singles chronology
"Seasons" (2023)	"World on Fire" (2024)

"World on Fire" is a song by American rock band Thirty Seconds to Mars, featured on their sixth studio album It's the End of the World but It's a Beautiful Day (2023).

It was released on April 26, 2024 through Concord Records, as the third single from the album.

== Background ==
"World on Fire" was written by Jared and Shannon Leto, with additional contributions from Steve McCutcheon, Johnny McDaid, and Ed Sheeran, of whom the first four produced the song alongside Oscar Neidhardt. It was recorded at the International Centre for the Advancement of the Arts and Sciences of Sound in Los Angeles, California. Frontman Jared Leto described the song as a reflection on the turbulent nature of the world, both environmentally and socially. With its introspective lyrics, the track continues the band's tradition of blending personal and global themes.

Musically, "World on Fire" reinforces the heavily layered production that defined much of the band's later works. It features a minimalist instrumentation, with clean guitars, subtle electronic elements, and a prominent vocal performance from Jared Leto. The lyrics of the song deal with themes of uncertainty, resistance, and hope in a world facing numerous crises.

== Reception ==
Critics have praised "World on Fire" for its emotional impact and its resonance with contemporary global issues. Nick Ruskell from Kerrang! magazine praised the song for its soaring electronic chorus, noting that it blends well with the album's broader sonic palette, which includes electronic beats and subtle guitars. The review highlights that this track, alongside others, showcases the band's evolution, moving away from the bombastic arena rock of This Is War (2009) while still maintaining a grand feel.

== Charts ==
Chart performance for "World on Fire"
Chart (2024)	Peak position
Czech Republic Airplay (ČNS IFPI)	8
Germany (Offizielle Deutsche Airplay)	66
Italy (Radio Top 40)	52
Latvia (TopHit)	5
San Marino (SMRRTV Top 50)	45
