= Seasons Tour =

2024–25 concert tour by Thirty Seconds to Mars

- World tour by Thirty Seconds to Mars
- Promotional poster for the tour
- Location: Asia; Europe; North America; Oceania; South America
- Associated album: It's the End of the World but It's a Beautiful Day
- Start date: March 14, 2024
- End date: July 19, 2025
- Legs: 8
- No. of shows: 85
- Supporting acts: AFI; Jagwar Twin; KennyHoopla; Oliver Malcolm; Poppy; Yours Truly

Thirty Seconds to Mars concert chronology
- Monolith Tour (2018–19); Seasons Tour (2024–25)

The Seasons Tour was a concert tour by American rock band Thirty Seconds to Mars in support of their sixth studio album, It's the End of the World but It's a Beautiful Day. It was announced on November 9, 2023 just after frontman Jared Leto became the first person to legally climb the Empire State Building in New York City. It began on March 14, 2024 in Santiago, Chile at Lollapalooza and concluded on July 19, 2025 in Porto, Portugal. The first non-festival show of the tour was in Kraków, Poland.

It was announced on March 18, 2024 that several European dates were rescheduled due to SAG-AFTRA actor strikes, interfering with Jared Leto's filming schedule.

== Staging ==
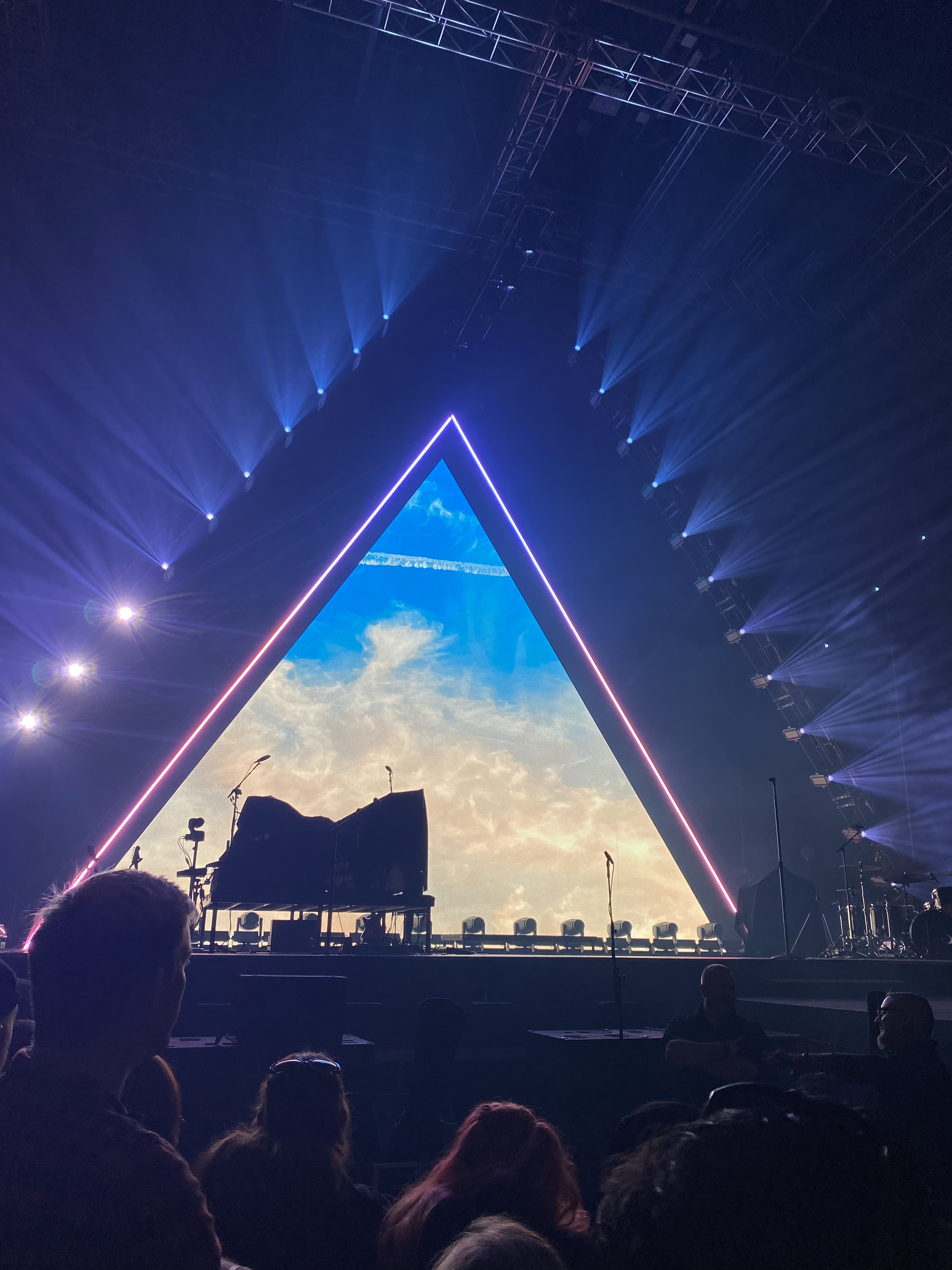
Stage design for the Seasons World Tour

The Seasons Tour by Thirty Seconds to Mars features a modern, visually immersive stage design created by Ben Cash of Flare Studio and creative director Louis Oliver. The setup includes a large LED backdrop that displays dynamic visuals, shifting to match the mood and themes of It's the End of the World but It's a Beautiful Day. Complemented by a sophisticated lighting design, the visuals and lighting work together to create a cohesive atmosphere, with synchronized effects enhancing the emotional tone of each performance.

== Reception ==
The tour has received generally positive reviews from critics and fans. According to The Guardian, Jared Leto's charisma and energetic stage presence shone through at the O2 Arena in London. The publication highlighted Leto's efforts to engage the audience, including inviting fans on stage and taking song requests, which added a personalized touch to the show.

Similarly, The Upcoming praised the band for their intimate and interactive approach during their London performance. The article noted how Thirty Seconds to Mars prioritized the fan experience, with spontaneous setlist changes based on audience requests and heartfelt moments between songs. This flexibility created an atmosphere that felt uniquely tailored to each show.

However, The Soundboard offered a more critical perspective on the Manchester show of the tour. While acknowledging the dedication of long-time fans in attendance, the review expressed concern about the band’s current trajectory, citing a decline in the quality of their recent material. Though it commended the band’s ability to maintain an emotional connection with the crowd despite these challenges.

At Nottingham's Motorpoint Arena, LeftLion highlighted the spectacle of the band's performance, complete with lavish stage design and an effort to energize the audience. While the review noted initial hesitancy among attendees, it acknowledged that the band successfully overcame this with their persistent and enthusiastic delivery. By the end of the evening, the crowd was reportedly fully immersed in the experience, showcasing the band's ability to win over their audience.

== Tour dates ==
List of 2024 concerts, showing date, city, country, venue and opening acts
Date (2024)	City	Country	Venue	Opening acts
March 14 (Note: The March 14, 2024 concert was a part of the Lollapalooza Chile sideshow.)	Santiago	Chile	Teatro Caupolicán	We Are the Grand
March 15 (Note: The March 15, 2024 concert was a part of Lollapalooza Chile.)	Santiago	Chile	Parque Bicentenario	—N/a
March 17 (Note: The March 17, 2024 concert was a part of Lollapalooza Argentina.)	Buenos Aires	Argentina	Hipódromo de San Isidro	—N/a
March 19 (Note: The March 19, 2024 concert was a part of Asuncionico.)	Asunción	Paraguay	Parque Olímpico	—N/a
March 21 (Note: The March 21, 2024 concert was a part of Festival Estéreo Picnic.)	Bogotá	Colombia	Festival Estéreo Picnic	—N/a
March 23 (Note: The March 23, 2024 concert was a part of Lollapalooza Brazil.)	São Paulo	Brazil	Autódromo de Interlagos	—N/a
March 30 (Note: Th March 30, 2024 concert was a part of Tecate Pa'l Norte.)	Monterrey	Mexico	Tecate Pa'l Norte	—N/a
May 9	Kraków	Poland	Tauron Arena	Jagwar Twin
May 10	Bratislava	Slovakia	Ondrej Nepela Arena	Jagwar Twin
May 12	Hamburg	Germany	Barclays Arena	Jagwar Twin
May 13	Berlin	Germany	Uber Arena	Jagwar Twin
May 15	Prague	Czech Republic	Sportovní hala Fortuna	Jagwar Twin
May 16	Budapest	Hungary	MVM Dome	Jagwar Twin
May 18	Vienna	Austria	Wiener Stadthalle	Jagwar Twin
May 19	Munich	Germany	Olympiahalle	Jagwar Twin
May 21	Paris	France	Accor Arena	Jagwar Twin
May 22	Zurich	Switzerland	Hallenstadion	Jagwar Twin
May 24	Casalecchio di Reno (Note: Promoted as Bologna.)	Italy	Unipol Arena	Jagwar Twin
May 25	Turin	Italy	Pala Alpitour	Jagwar Twin
May 27	Madrid	Spain	WiZink Center	Jagwar Twin
May 29	Lisbon	Portugal	Altice Arena	Jagwar Twin
June 1 (Note: The June 1, 2024 concert was a part of O Son do Camiño.)	Santiago de Compostela (Note: Promoted as Galicia.)	Spain	Monte do Gozo	Jagwar Twin
June 3 (Note: Originally scheduled for April 17, 2024.)	Nottingham	England	Motorpoint Arena	Jagwar Twin
June 4 (Note: Originally scheduled for April 23, 2024.)	London	England	The O_{2} Arena	Jagwar Twin
June 6 (Note: Originally scheduled for April 16, 2024.)	Glasgow	Scotland	The OVO Hydro	Jagwar Twin
June 7 (Note: Originally scheduled for April 19, 2024.)	Manchester	England	AO Arena	Jagwar Twin
June 9 (Note: Originally scheduled for April 20, 2024.)	Birmingham	England	Utilita Arena	Jagwar Twin
June 10 (Note: Originally scheduled for April 22, 2024.)	Cardiff	Wales	Utilita Arena	Jagwar Twin
June 12 (Note: Originally scheduled for April 26, 2024.)	Brussels	Belgium	Forest National	Jagwar Twin
June 13 (Note: Originally scheduled for April 25, 2024.)	Amsterdam	Netherlands	AFAS Live (Note: Originally scheduled for the Ziggo Dome.)	Jagwar Twin
June 15 (Note: Originally scheduled for April 27, 2024.)	Hanover	Germany	ZAG-Arena	Jagwar Twin
June 16 (Note: Originally scheduled for April 29, 2024.)	Cologne	Germany	Lanxess Arena	Jagwar Twin
July 17	Milwaukee	United States	Eagles Ballroom	Jagwar Twin
July 20	Waukee	United States	Vibrant Music Hall	Jagwar Twin
July 21	Waite Park	United States	The Ledge Amphitheater	Jagwar Twin
July 23	Kansas City	United States	Uptown Theatre	Jagwar Twin
July 26	Auburn	United States	White River Amphitheater	AFI; Poppy; KennyHoopla
July 27	Ridgefield	United States	RV Inn Style Resorts Amphitheater	AFI; Poppy; KennyHoopla
July 30	Salt Lake City	United States	USANA Amphitheatre	AFI; Poppy; KennyHoopla
July 31	Morrison	United States	Red Rocks Amphitheatre	AFI; Poppy; KennyHoopla
August 3	Nashville	United States	Ascend Amphitheater	AFI; Poppy; KennyHoopla
August 6	Clarkston	United States	Pine Knob Music Theatre	AFI; Poppy; KennyHoopla
August 7	Cuyahoga Falls	United States	Blossom Music Center	AFI; Poppy; KennyHoopla
August 8 (Note: Originally scheduled for August 9, 2024.)	Noblesville	United States	Ruoff Music Center	AFI; Poppy; KennyHoopla
August 10	Chicago	United States	Huntington Bank Pavilion	AFI; Poppy; KennyHoopla
August 12	Toronto	Canada	Budweiser Stage	AFI; Poppy; KennyHoopla
August 14	Camden	United States	Freedom Mortgage Pavilion	AFI; Poppy; KennyHoopla
August 15	Columbia	United States	Merriweather Post Pavilion	AFI; Poppy; KennyHoopla
August 17	New York City	United States	Barclays Center	AFI; Poppy; KennyHoopla
August 18	Mansfield	United States	Xfinity Center	AFI; Poppy; KennyHoopla
August 20	Charlotte	United States	PNC Music Pavilion	AFI; Poppy; KennyHoopla
August 23	West Palm Beach	United States	iTHINK Financial Amphitheatre	AFI; Poppy; KennyHoopla
August 24	East Lake-Orient Park (Note: Promoted as Tampa.)	United States	MidFlorida Credit Union Amphitheatre	AFI; Poppy; KennyHoopla
August 27	Dallas	United States	Dos Equis Pavilion	AFI; Poppy; KennyHoopla
August 29	Austin	United States	Germania Insurance Amphitheatre	AFI; Poppy; KennyHoopla
September 1	Phoenix	United States	Talking Stick Resort Amphitheatre	AFI; Poppy; KennyHoopla
September 4	Mountain View	United States	Shoreline Amphitheatre	AFI; Poppy; KennyHoopla
September 12	Melbourne	Australia	Rod Laver Arena	Yours Truly
September 14	Sydney	Australia	Qudos Bank Arena	Yours Truly
September 17	Brisbane	Australia	Riverstage	Yours Truly
September 20 (Note: The concerts on September 20 and 22, 2024 were a part of Singapore Grand Prix.)	Marina Bay	Singapore	Marina Bay Street Circuit	—N/a
September 22	Marina Bay	Singapore	Marina Bay Street Circuit	—N/a
October 1	Helsinki	Finland	Ice Hall	Oliver Malcolm
October 3	Riga	Latvia	Arena Riga	Oliver Malcolm
October 4	Kaunas	Lithuania	Žalgiris Arena	Oliver Malcolm
October 6 (Note: Originally scheduled for May 4, 2024.)	Copenhagen	Denmark	K.B. Hallen (Note: Originally scheduled for the Forum Black Box.)	Oliver Malcolm
October 7 (Note: Originally scheduled for May 1, 2024.)	Stockholm	Sweden	Hovet	Oliver Malcolm
October 9 (Note: Originally scheduled for May 2, 2024.)	Oslo	Norway	Spektrum	Oliver Malcolm
October 11	Belgrade	Serbia	Belgrade Arena	Oliver Malcolm
October 13	Almaty	Kazakhstan	Baluan Sholak Sports Palace	Oliver Malcolm
October 15	Astana	Kazakhstan	Palace of Martial Arts	Oliver Malcolm
October 17	Tashkent	Uzbekistan	Humo Arena	Oliver Malcolm
October 19	Tbilisi	Georgia	Tbilisi Sports Palace	Oliver Malcolm
October 22	Baku	Azerbaijan	National Gymnastics Arena	Oliver Malcolm
October 25	Bucharest	Romania	Laminor Arena	Oliver Malcolm
October 27	Istanbul	Turkey	Ülker Sports and Event Hall	Oliver Malcolm
December 12	Dubai	United Arab Emirates	Coca-Cola Arena	Oliver Malcolm
December 14 (Note: The December 14, 2024 concert is set to be a part of Soundstorm Festival.)	Riyadh	Saudi Arabia	Banban	Oliver Malcolm

List of 2025 concerts, showing date, city, country, venue and opening acts
Date (2025)	City	Country	Venue	Opening acts
June 21	Almaty	Kazakhstan	Spartak Stadium	Yonaka
June 25	Łódź	Poland	Atlas Arena	—N/a
June 27	Halle	Germany	Freilichtbühne Peißnitz	Plexiphones
June 28	Sankt Goarshausen	Germany	Freilichtbühne Loreley	Plexiphones
June 29	Mönchengladbach	Germany	Warsteiner HockeyPark	Plexiphones
July 2	Milan	Italy	Hippodrome of San Siro	Inhaler
July 3 (Note: The July 3, 2025 concert is set to be a part of GO! 2025.)	Gorizia	Italy	Casa Rossa Arena	—N/a
July 5 (Note: The July 5, 2025 concert is set to be a part of Lucca Summer Festival.)	Lucca	Italy	Piazza Napoleone	—N/a
July 6 (Note: The July 6, 2025 concert is set to be a part of Noisy Naples 2025 festival.)	Naples	Italy	Arena Flegrea	—N/a
July 8 (Note: The July 8, 2025 concert is set to be a part of Collisioni Festival.)	Alba	Italy	Piazza Pio Cesare	—N/a
July 11 (Note: The July 11, 2025 concert is set to be a part of Cruïlla Festival.)	Barcelona	Spain	Parc del Fòrum	—N/a
July 15	Fuengirola	Spain	Unicaja Stage	TBA
July 18 (Note: The July 18, 2025 concert is set to be a part of Tsunami Festival.)	Gijón	Spain	Plaza Mayor	—N/a
July 19 (Note: The July 19, 2025 concert is set to be a part of MEO Marés Vivas.)	Porto	Portugal	Old Madalena Campsite	—N/a

== Cancelled shows ==
Date	City	Country	Venue	Reason
August 2, 2024	Maryland Heights	United States	Hollywood Casino Amphitheatre	—N/a
August 21, 2024	Atlanta	United States	Lakewood Amphitheater	—N/a
September 19, 2024	Auckland	New Zealand	Spark Arena	—N/a

== Personnel ==
Thirty Seconds to Mars

- Jared Leto - lead vocals, guitar
- Shannon Leto - drums, percussion, occasional lead vocals

Touring members

- Stevie Aiello - guitar, bass, backing vocals, piano
