= It's the End of the World but It's a Beautiful Day =

- One of ten covers created for the album. This is the cover used on the Apple Music release of the album.

Studio album by Thirty Seconds to Mars
- Released: September 15, 2023
- Studios: The International Centre for the Advancement of the Arts and Sciences of Sound (Los Angeles, California)
- Genres: Pop; electronica
- Length: 33:25
- Label: Concord
- Producers: Jon Bellion; J. P. Clark; Dave Gibson; Johnny Goldstein; Jared Leto; Shannon Leto; Mag; Michael Matosic; Ammar Malik; Steve McCutcheon; Connor McDonough; Riley McDonough; The Monsters & Strangerz; Oak; Oscar Neidhardt; Tim Randolph; Dan Reynolds; John Ryan; Jackson Wise; Eugene Veltman

Thirty Seconds to Mars chronology
America (2018)	It's the End of the World but It's a Beautiful Day (2023)

Singles from It's the End of the World but It's a Beautiful Day
- 1. "Stuck" Released: May 8, 2023; 2. "Seasons" Released: September 22, 2023; 3. "World on Fire" Released: April 26, 2024

It's the End of the World but It's a Beautiful Day is the sixth studio album by American rock band Thirty Seconds to Mars, released on September 15, 2023, through Concord. It is the first album after their debut without guitarist Tomo Miličević who left the band in June 2018.

== Background and development ==
Sitting down for NME in November 2021, Leto revealed that they had penned 200 tracks for their upcoming record. Much of the material was inspired by 1970s and 1980s electronic music. He explained that the band took advantage of their time in lockdown. At the time in 2021, Jared said that they were awaiting "the right opportunity" to release it. On another occasion, in March 2022, Leto stated that the band was sitting on "two albums, maybe three, worth of material", that took him "a month or two to get into the swing of things". Once again, he pointed out the fact that the two were confined to one place was a unique situation. About a year later, on April 6, 2023, Leto announced that they were "getting ready" to release new music.

The band shared a teaser of a new song titled "Stuck" with a 14-second grayscale preview clip on May 5, 2023. The "powerful, high-energy track" was released as the lead single on May 8, 2023, with an accompanying music video directed by Jared Leto himself. To Leto, song and video signify "a celebration of art, design, fashion, and the remarkable people who bring them to life". Release of the song was accompanied by the announcement of the album, their first in over five years. It was made available for pre-order in various CD and vinyl editions. On September 22, the second single, "Seasons" was released.

On November 9, the band announced the Seasons Tour in support of the album, with legs in North and South America, Europe and Oceania.

== Critical reception ==
Professional ratings
Aggregate scores
Source	Rating
Metacritic	57/100
Review scores
Source	Rating
AllMusic	3/5 stars
Billboard	favorable
Clash	8/10
Classic Rock	3/5 stars
Hot Press	5/10
Kerrang!	4/5 stars
The Line of Best Fit	4/10
Riff Magazine	7/10
Toronto Star	4/5 stars
Trend	4/5 stars

It's the End of the World but It's a Beautiful Day received a score of 57 out of 100 on review aggregator Metacritic based on five critics' reviews, indicating "mixed or average" reception. In his review for Kerrang!, Nick Russell praised the band's will to change and stated "as another move forward, It's the End of the World but It's a Beautiful Day succeeds in part because, once again, Thirty Seconds to Mars haven't sounded like this before. More power to them for that". Mark Kennedy from the Toronto Star awarded it four stars out of five and while praising the "anguished torch song 'Never Not Love You' to the encouraging 'Get Up Kid'", stated that the album "is exactly what it sounds like — optimistic, despite the doom". Trend's K. Kasey stated that the band delivers "a pop album that is as catchy as it is danceable", further saying "that it is difficult not to wonder if behind this artificial euphoria we can find something more than a diversion from the brother duo, but after more than twenty years of career and with their ability to adapt to new sounds and make them their own, the solvency of the band is more than assured".

Isabella Miller, writing for Clash, gave the album a positive review and commented that "it feels as though experimentation was at the centre of this record, with digital soundbites and electronic instruments at the forefront of many of the tunes, yet still beautifully intertwined with the traditional line up". Classic Rock gave the album three stars out of five and summarized the band's change in style by saying "double down on revitalising their music while finding new logs to throw on the philosophical fire". In First Hubbard's review for The Upcoming, he stated the album was "uplifting" and described the band as "ever-evolving". He rated the album four out of five. In a far more critical review, Steven Loftin at The Line of Best Fit criticised the album saying, "[t]he beats go by listlessly, rarely igniting any semblance of emotive response" and that "[t]hey're often joined by anything but a coarse Leto whisper, failing to ever establish a personal take on it", but noted that "[t]hankfully, this new electronic palette they're toting isn't wholly lost" and that the album "at least hosts a heart".

== Track listing ==
It's the End of the World but It's a Beautiful Day track listing
No.	Title	Writer(s)	Producer(s)	Length
1.	"Stuck"	Jared Leto; Ammar Malik; JKash; John Ryan	J. Leto; Shannon Leto; Malik; Oscar Neidhardt; Ryan	3:02
2.	"Life Is Beautiful"	J. Leto; S. Leto; Marco Borrero; Tim Randolph; Dan Reynolds	J. Leto; S. Leto; Mag; Randolph; Reynolds	3:19
3.	"Seasons"	J. Leto; S. Leto; Johnny Goldstein; Connor McDonough; Riley McDonough	J. Leto; S. Leto; Goldstein; C. McDonough; R. McDonough	2:46
4.	"Get Up Kid"	J. Leto; S. Leto; Malik; Jackson Wise	J. Leto; S. Leto; Malik; Neidhardt; Wise	2:58
5.	"Love These Days"	J. Leto; S. Leto; Ori Dulitzki; Natalia Lalwani	J. Leto; S. Leto; Eugene Veltman	3:00
6.	"World on Fire"	J. Leto; S. Leto; Steve McCutcheon; Johnny McDaid; Ed Sheeran	J. Leto; S. Leto; McCutcheon; McDaid; Neidhardt	3:18
7.	"7:1"	J. Leto; S. Leto	J. Leto; S. Leto; Neidhardt	2:45
8.	"Never Not Love You"	J. Leto; S. Leto; Jon Bellion; The Monsters & Strangerz	J. Leto; S. Leto; Bellion; The Monsters & Strangerz	3:14
9.	"Midnight Prayer"	J. Leto; S. Leto; J. P. Clark; Dave Gibson	J. Leto; S. Leto; Clark; Gibson	2:34
10.	"Lost These Days"	J. Leto; S. Leto; Bellion; The Monsters & Strangerz	J. Leto; S. Leto; Bellion; The Monsters & Strangerz	3:05
11.	"Avalanche"	J. Leto; S. Leto	J. Leto; S. Leto; Oak; Neidhardt	3:24
Total length:				33:25

== Personnel ==
Thirty Seconds to Mars

- Jared Leto – guitars, bass, keyboards, lead vocals (all tracks except 9)
- Shannon Leto – drums, percussion, lead vocals (9)

Additional contributors

- Mike Bozzi – mastering
- Spike Stent – mixing (1, 2, 4–6, 8–10)
- Josh Gudwin – mixing (3)
- Ed Sheeran – guitars (6)
- Oscar Neidhardt – mixing (7), engineering (10)
- Rob Kinelski – mixing (11)

== Charts ==
Chart performance for It's the End of the World but It's a Beautiful Day
Chart (2023)	Peak position
Australian Albums (ARIA)	9
Austrian Albums (Ö3 Austria)	17
Belgian Albums (Ultratop Flanders)	98
Belgian Albums (Ultratop Wallonia)	24
French Albums (SNEP)	34
German Albums (Offizielle Top 100)	16
Italian Albums (FIMI)	12
Japanese Download Albums (Billboard Japan)	93
Polish Albums (ZPAV)	16
Portuguese Albums (AFP)	25
Scottish Albums (Official Charts)	6
Spanish Albums (Promusicae)	35
Swiss Albums (Schweizer Hitparade)	7
UK Albums (Official Charts)	20
US Billboard 200	76
US Independent Albums (Billboard)	16
US Top Alternative Albums (Billboard)	9
US Top Rock Albums (Billboard)	11
