= Antoine Becks =

Canadian-American musician

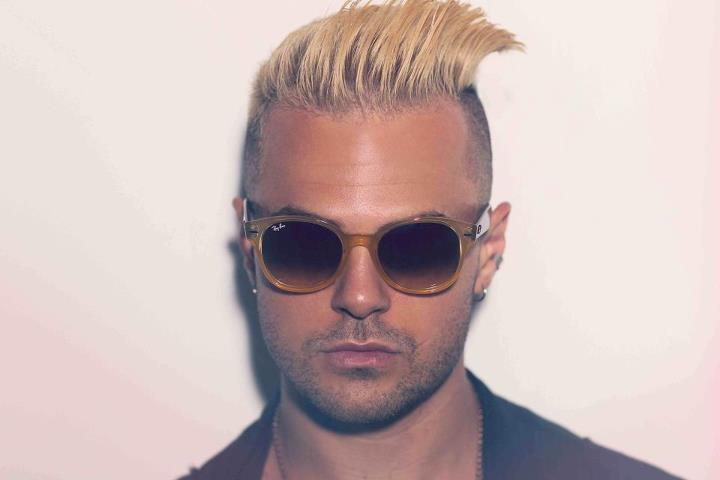

Background information
- Born: Antoine Toupin; 28 June 1981 (age 45); Montreal, Quebec, Canada
- Genres: Alternative, electronic, dance, house, synthpop, new wave
- Occupations: Musician, DJ, singer, producer, actor
- Years active: 1999–present
- Labels: Vandit, System, Mute, Ultra, Transmission, Mad Decent, Radikal
- Website: antoinebecks.com

Antoine Becks (born Antoine Toupin; 28 June 1981) is a Canadian-American musician, producer, former singer of the live act duo Second Sun, and frontman of the alternative band CB7.

== Early life ==
Becks was born in Montreal, but lived in New York City in the first four years of his life. He is French Canadian on his father's side and American on his mother's side. His parents are both artists, which is why they've supported his desire to be a musician since the beginning. In an interview during one of his visits to Kyiv he told the story of, "When I was 5 years old, I was obsessed with The Beatles. I made myself a cardboard guitar, sat everyone around and pretended that I was one of The Beatles. I had my first real guitar at the age of 7. I sang and played, and I never stopped". At 8 years old, besides the guitar, he already played bass, drums and the piano.

As a teenager, Becksne played in many garage bands but he left them eventually. Being a fan of raves, he used things like Nintendo gloves and pants from the bubble polyethylen, and went to the clubs, whose music he always felt in his heart.

== Career ==
=== Acting ===
At 12 years old, Becks started on a Canadian TV series called Le Retour and a teen drama called ZAP and a cameo appearance in the Canadian court show Les grands procès. At the age of 20, after he got his first record deal with Vandit records, Antoine gave up acting to focus on his electronic live act Second Sun.

=== Second Sun ===
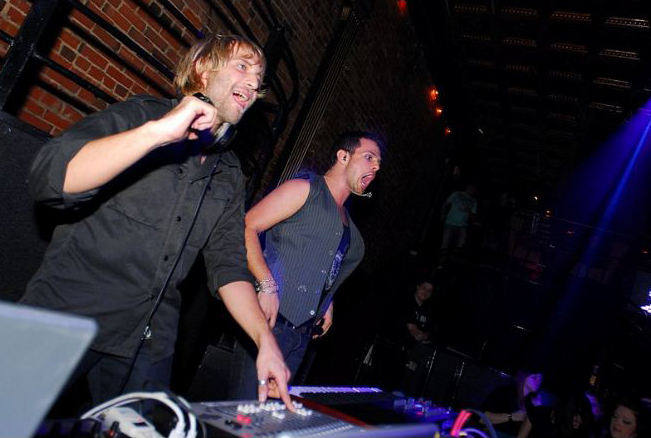
Adam White (L) & Antoine Becks (R) as the live act Second sun

In early 2000, Becks met Adam White, who worked at a music store at the time. "I came in the store to buy something and it all ended up with me asking Adam to join me", he recalls. They later became known as Second Sun.

Antoine was new to producing electronic dance music so it was a learning process, but after six months of trying to create his first track, Antoine gave a CD to Paul Van Dyk, asking him what he thought about it. A week later, Paul offered to sign Second Sun to Vandit Records and they took the chance. From then on, the requests for Second Sun shows went off the scale.

Their debut album Inside Out was expected to be trance, but the duet surprised everyone with a variety of sounds and acoustic instruments. "We love the airy feeling of trance music, but at the same time we wanted to be more varied and incorporate proper songs, not just dancefloor bangers. At the time it was rare to hear a rock-driven male vocal on a dance track", said Antoine, and it was ultimately reflected in their single "Doing It Well" with Paul Harris of Dirty Vegas. Second Sun also collaborated with Paul Van Dyk on the hit single "Crush", which was on Paul Van Dyk's Grammy-nominated album Reflections. Second Sun also collaborated with Grammy-winner Cedric Gervais on a number of house singles (including a remix of Queen's "Another One Bites The Dust" (appearing as "The Miami Project") and Antoine's voice was featured on Sharam's hit single "P.A.T.T. (Party All The Time)".

Labels releasing this music were Ultra Records, System Recordings, Ministry of Sound, Positiva/EMI, Universal and Mute. In late 2010, Antoine posted on his official Facebook that Second Sun would no longer be making music due to wanting to pursue his upcoming band, CB7.

Official group members

- Antoine Becks – vocals, production, synthesizer
- Adam White – production, synthesizer

Albums: Inside Out – 19 April 2005

Tracks:

- 1 Inside Out
- 2 Rock The West Side
- 3 Pop Muzik (Second Sun Remix)
- 4 My Bed Is Burning
- 5 Everything
- 6 The Spell
- 7 Playground
- 8 Crush
- 9 Love Simulator
- 10 He Said She Said (duet w/ Tiffany)

Uncovered EP – 21 February 2006

Tracks:

- 1 Staring at the Sun
- 2 The Spell (Radio Mix)
- 3 Pop Muzik (Radio Mix)
- 4 Dawn
- 5 Wildlife
- 6 He Said She Said (Radio Version)
- 7 Dream On

The lost weekend – 31 August 2010 Tracks:

- 1 Intro
- 2 A Girl Like You
- 3 Golden
- 4 We Own The Night(Radio mix)
- 5 Howl at the Moon
- 6 Fire & Water
- 7 Lonely After All
- 8 More Pills
- 9 Doing It Well
- 10 Disconnected
- 11 Halfway Love
- 12 Savior
- 13 Slaves of the Sun

Sun king EP – 22 March 2011 Tracks:

- 1 It's About To Go Down
- 2 Sun King
- 3 The Message
- 4 Sona
- 5 The Lost Weekend
- 6 Sun King (Extended Mix)

Singles:

- Crush – Paul Van Dyke Ft. Second Sun
- Ready or Not – Cedric Gervais Ft. Second Sun
- Love is the answer – Mya Ft. Cedric Gervais and Second Sun
- Pills – Cedric Gervais Ft. Second Sun
- Party all the time – Sharam Ft. Second Sun
- Doing it well – EC Twins Ft. Second Sun
- Empire
- Playground
- The Spell
- We own the night
- Fire and water

=== CB7 ===
CB7 started with the meeting of Becks and Shannon Leto, drummer of the popular American band Thirty Seconds to Mars. They met at a party in Miami at the end of 2009.

In spring 2010, Shannon mentioned CB7 for the first time in an interview:

Finally, I can share it with all of you. This is what I've been working at for several years... It's CB7.

— Shannon Leto

.

Together with his cousin and drummer Matt Becks, bass player Noah Luger and guitarist Adam White, who was also a member of Second Sun, the band released four demo-tracks and toured as the opening band for Thirty Seconds to Mars in the North American leg of their "Closer to the Edge" tour.

In January 2011, Becks announced that the current group members were his cousin Matt and himself. Later Chelsea Davis, Frankie Sizr and Jamie Reed joined the group, after meeting them in L.A. and Montreal through friends, as live members. Chelsea has her own band called Annabelle vs the Villain and Jamie is a friend of Jared Leto, Shannon's younger brother and singer of Thirty Seconds to Mars. After Shannon and Antoine broke up their live act, Shannon said via Twitter he will no longer manage CB7. On 15 March 2014, Antoine stated he will no longer pursue working on CB7 due to him working on his own solo music.

Former group members

- Antoine Becks – production, vocals, guitar, keyboards, songwriting (2010–2014)
- Chelsea Davis – bass guitar, keyboard, drums (2011–2012)
- Frankie Sizr – guitar (2011–2012)
- Matt Becks – drums (2010–2012)
- Adam White – guitar, keyboard (2010–2011)
- Noah Luger – bass guitar (2010–2011)

Online releases:

- Pretend for the weekend
- Going nowhere
- True for a wild fate
- Union Square

=== Shannon Leto & Antoine Becks ===
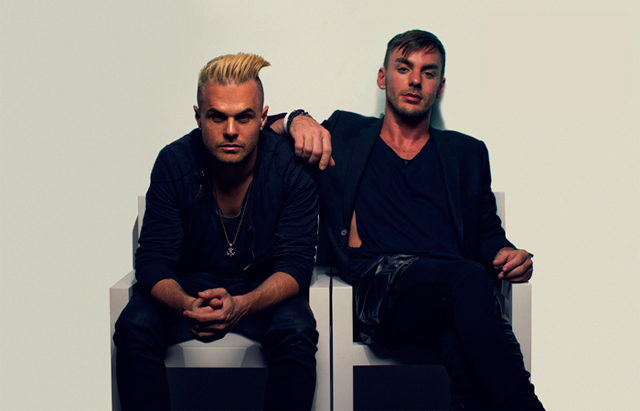
Antoine Becks (L) & Shannon Leto (R)

The duo Shannon Leto & Antoine Becks was created in 2011, originally as an after-party for a Thirty Seconds to Mars project. However it charmed the world's dance stages, and the duo became independent and toured all over the world.

According to Shannon and Antoine, their project is "when two artists get together to wreak havoc in the night clubs all over the world".

In summer 2012 the official website, YouTube and Twitter were removed; this led the fans of the group to believe they broke up.

Official project members

- Antoine Becks – DJ, production
- Shannon Leto – percussion

=== DJ Antoine Becks ===
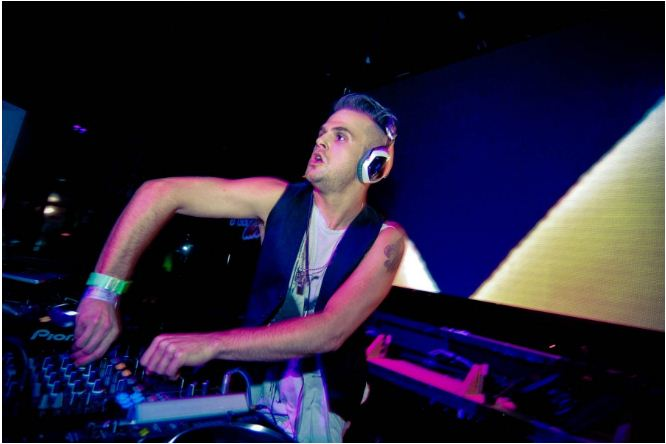
Antoine DJing

Besides being a member of Second Sun, Antoine was playing in the clubs all over the world on his own. Presently, Antoine recorded the single "Life of the Wild", which was released 28 January 2013. and on iTunes 17 February 2013.

Just a week after the release, "Life of the Wild" took the 22nd place in the dance chart on TwitMusic. He also had a release on Diplo's label Mad Decent.

Mixes:

- Welcome to 2012 Mix
- Summer 2012 Mix
- Exclusive Twitmusic Mix

Singles:

- Life of the Wild
- This Is Our Time (Official Summerland Anthem)
- Insane (feat. Moska)

• Higher (with Maestro Harrell feat. Sherry St-Germain)

Antoine Becks' music has also appeared in movies and TV commercials such as Michael Bay's blockbuster "Pain And Gain", and ads for Coca-Cola and the NHL Network. In 2016, he co-produced the David Guetta & Cedric Gervais feat. Chris Willis collaboration "Would I Lie To You". Other co-productions with Cedric Gervais include a collaboration with Grammy-winning Latin Rock artist Juanes for "Este Amor", a remix of Odesza's "Say My Name", which got 13 Million Spotify plays since its release and a remix of Clean Bandit's "Tears". Along with doing more production for TV and film, Antoine Becks is now developing his new project under the name Vesper.
