= Monolith Tour =

2018–19 concert tour by Thirty Seconds to Mars

- Tour by Thirty Seconds to Mars
- Promotional poster for the tour
- Location: Europe; North America; South America
- Associated album: America
- Start date: March 12, 2018
- End date: August 17, 2019
- Legs: 5
- No. of shows: 118

Thirty Seconds to Mars concert chronology
- Carnivores Tour (2014); Monolith Tour (2018–19); Seasons Tour (2024–25)

The Monolith Tour was a concert tour by American rock band Thirty Seconds to Mars. Staged in support of the band's fifth studio album America (2018), the tour visited arenas and stadiums throughout 2018 and 2019. It was initially announced in October 2017 with European dates being released at the same time, with North American dates announced afterwards. It began on March 12, 2018 in Basel, Switzerland, and concluded on August 17, 2019 in Großpösna, Germany. The support acts for the tour included Walk the Moon, K.Flay, MisterWives, Joywave, and Welshly Arms.

The tour was promoted by Live Nation and sponsored in-part by AT&T. Due to the large demand and tickets selling out in minutes in multiple locations, extra tour dates were added to the itinerary.

== Background ==
Thirty Seconds to Mars officially announced the tour on October 6, 2017, shortly after releasing the song "Walk on Water" as the lead single from their fifth studio album. The band debuted live the song at the 2017 MTV Video Music Awards, during a performance which was described as groundbreaking since it became the first live broadcasting shown through innovative infrared technology. The announcement came after the band concluded a promotional tour with Muse and PVRIS, which was one of the highest-grossing North American tour of 2017, according to Pollstar's annual year end tour chart. On February 8, 2018, tour dates were revealed for North America in two legs. Frontman Jared Leto made the announcement on The Ellen DeGeneres Show, giving members of the audience a ticket to an upcoming show. In addition, it was announced that the band's fifth studio album America will be released on April 6, 2018. Walk the Moon, K.Flay, MisterWives, Joywave, and Welshly Arms were confirmed as the supporting acts on select dates.

== Development ==
Initially, twenty-nine shows were scheduled in Europe beginning in March 2018. Pre-sale tickets for the tour were offered to the band's fan club members on October 11, 2017, before going on sale to the general public on October 13. Initial dates for the tour sold out, prompting Live Nation to extend the tour with additional dates. In February 2018, thirty shows were announced to take place across the United States and Canada, beginning in June 2018. For the North American dates, Thirty Seconds to Mars partnered with Citigroup and AT&T; the latter partly sponsored the tour, including the Camp Mars Music Festival held in Malibu, California, by the band. Tickets for North American dates went on sale to the general public on February 16 at Live Nation. Copies of the album are included along with the purchased tickets. Special privileges were provided to Citibank card holders, who had the opportunity to utilize the pre-sale in multiple locations on February 13.

On March 16, 2018, it was announced that the lead guitarist of the band, Tomo Miličević, would be taking a break from touring due to personal matters. In June 2018, he officially announced his departure from the band.

== Tour dates ==
List of 2018 concerts, showing date, city, country, venue and opening acts
Date	City	Country	Venue	Opening acts
March 12, 2018	Basel	Switzerland	St. Jakobshalle	—
March 14, 2018	Paris	France	AccorHotels Arena	—
March 16, 2018	Rome	Italy	PalaLottomatica	—
March 17, 2018	Bologna	Italy	Unipol Arena	—
March 18, 2018	Munich	Germany	Olympiahalle	—
March 20, 2018	Amsterdam	Netherlands	Ziggo Dome	—
March 21, 2018	Antwerp	Belgium	Lotto Arena	—
March 23, 2018	Cardiff	Wales	Motorpoint Arena Cardiff	—
March 24, 2018	Manchester	England	Manchester Arena	—
March 25, 2018	Glasgow	Scotland	SSE Hydro	—
March 27, 2018	London	England	The O_{2} Arena	—
March 29, 2018	Birmingham	England	Arena Birmingham	—
April 12, 2018	Madrid	Spain	WiZink Center	—
April 13, 2018	Barcelona	Spain	Palau Sant Jordi	—
April 14, 2018	Bilbao	Spain	Bizkaia Arena	—
April 17, 2018	Vienna	Austria	Wiener Stadthalle	—
April 18, 2018	Łódź	Poland	Atlas Arena	—
April 19, 2018	Prague	Czech Republic	Tipsport Arena	—
April 21, 2018	Copenhagen	Denmark	TAP1	—
April 22, 2018	Stockholm	Sweden	Annexet	—
April 23, 2018	Oslo	Norway	Oslo Spektrum	—
April 25, 2018	Helsinki	Finland	Helsinki Ice Hall	—
April 27, 2018	Saint Petersburg	Russia	Saint Petersburg Sports and Concert Complex	—
April 28, 2018	Moscow	Russia	Olimpiyskiy	—
April 30, 2018	Kyiv	Ukraine	Palats Sportu	—
May 2, 2018	Hamburg	Germany	Barclaycard Arena	—
May 3, 2018	Berlin	Germany	Mercedes-Benz Arena	—
May 4, 2018 (Note: The concert of May 4, 2018 in Cologne at the Lanxess Arena was originally planned to take place on March 11, 2018, but was rescheduled due to logistical and scheduling reasons.)	Cologne	Germany	Lanxess Arena	—
May 12, 2018 (Note: This concert is a part of KROQ Weenie Roast.)	Carson	United States	StubHub Center	—
May 26, 2018 (Note: This concert is a part of This is Tomorrow Festival.)	Newcastle	England	Spillers Wharf	Don Broco
May 27, 2018 (Note: This concert is a part of BBC Music's Biggest Weekend.)	Swansea	Wales	Singleton Park	—
May 29, 2018	Belfast	Northern Ireland	SSE Arena	Keywest
May 30, 2018	Dublin	Ireland	3Arena	Keywest
June 1, 2018 (Note: This concert is a part of Rock am Ring.)	Nürburg	Germany	Nürburgring	—
June 2, 2018 (Note: This concert is a part of Rock im Park.)	Nuremberg	Germany	Zeppelinfeld	—
June 6, 2018	Toronto	Canada	Budweiser Stage	Walk the Moon; MisterWives; Joywave
June 8, 2018	Laval	Canada	Place Bell	Walk the Moon; MisterWives; Joywave
June 9, 2018	Hartford	United States	Xfinity Theatre	Walk the Moon; MisterWives; Joywave
June 10, 2018	Mansfield	United States	Xfinity Center	Walk the Moon; MisterWives; Joywave
June 12, 2018	Clarkston	United States	DTE Energy Music Theatre	Walk the Moon; MisterWives; Joywave
June 13, 2018	Burgettstown	United States	KeyBank Pavilion	Walk the Moon; MisterWives; Joywave
June 15, 2018	Chicago	United States	Huntington Bank Pavilion	MisterWives; Joywave
June 16, 2018	Cuyahoga Falls	United States	Blossom Music Center	Walk the Moon; MisterWives; Joywave
June 17, 2018 (Note: This concert is a part of Radio 104.5 Birthday Show.)	Camden	United States	BB&T Pavilion	Walk the Moon; MisterWives; Joywave
June 19, 2018	Gilford	United States	Bank of New Hampshire Pavilion	Walk the Moon; MisterWives; Joywave
June 20, 2018	New York City	United States	Madison Square Garden	Walk the Moon; MisterWives; Joywave
June 21, 2018	Holmdel	United States	PNC Bank Arts Center	Walk the Moon; MisterWives; Joywave
June 23, 2018 (Note: This concert is a part of Machaca Fest.)	Monterrey	Mexico	Fundidora Park	—
June 26, 2018	Bristow	United States	Jiffy Lube Live	Walk the Moon; MisterWives; Joywave
June 27, 2018	Charlotte	United States	PNC Music Pavilion	Walk the Moon; MisterWives; Joywave; Sir Sly
June 29, 2018	West Palm Beach	United States	Coral Sky Amphitheatre	Walk the Moon; MisterWives; Joywave
June 30, 2018	Tampa	United States	MidFlorida Credit Union Amphitheatre	Walk the Moon; MisterWives; Joywave
July 1, 2018	Jacksonville	United States	Daily's Place	Walk the Moon; MisterWives; Joywave
July 3, 2018	Pelham	United States	Oak Mountain Amphitheatre	Walk the Moon; Welshly Arms
July 6, 2018	The Woodlands	United States	Cynthia Woods Mitchell Pavilion	Walk the Moon; K.Flay; Welshly Arms
July 7, 2018	Austin	United States	Austin360 Amphitheater	Walk the Moon; K.Flay; Welshly Arms
July 8, 2018	Rogers	United States	Walmart Arkansas Music Pavilion	Walk the Moon; K.Flay; Welshly Arms
July 9, 2018	Maryland Heights	United States	Hollywood Casino Amphitheatre	Walk the Moon; K.Flay; Welshly Arms
July 11, 2018	Dallas	United States	Dos Equis Pavilion	Walk the Moon; K.Flay; Welshly Arms
July 12, 2018	Oklahoma City	United States	Zoo Amphitheatre	Walk the Moon; K.Flay; Welshly Arms
July 14, 2018	West Valley City	United States	USANA Amphitheatre	Walk the Moon; K.Flay; Welshly Arms
July 15, 2018	Greenwood	United States	Fiddler's Green Amphitheater	Walk the Moon; K.Flay; Welshly Arms
July 18, 2018	Mountain View	United States	Shoreline Amphitheatre	Walk the Moon; K.Flay; Welshly Arms
July 19, 2018	Inglewood	United States	The Forum	Walk the Moon; K.Flay; Welshly Arms
July 21, 2018	Chula Vista	United States	Mattress Firm Amphitheatre	Walk the Moon; K.Flay; Welshly Arms
July 22, 2018	Phoenix	United States	Ak-Chin Pavilion	Walk the Moon; K.Flay; Welshly Arms
August 11, 2018	Malibu	United States	Camp Mars Music Festival	—
August 12, 2018	Malibu	United States	Camp Mars Music Festival	—
August 17, 2018	Bratsch	Switzerland	Open-Air Gampel	—
August 18, 2018 (Note: This concert is a part of Brussels Summer Festival.)	Brussels	Belgium	Place des Palais	—
August 20, 2018	Stockholm	Sweden	Gröna Lund	—
August 22, 2018 (Note: This concert is a part of Junge Garde.)	Dresden	Germany	Großer Garten	—
August 23, 2018 (Note: This concert is a part of Strand Festival.)	Zamárdi	Hungary	Lake Balaton	—
August 25, 2018 (Note: This concert is a part of Rock en Seine.)	City of light	France	Parc de Saint-Cloud	—
August 27, 2018	Freiburg im Breisgau	Germany	Messe Freiburg	Don Broco
August 29, 2018	Kraków	Poland	Tauron Arena Kraków	Natalia Nykiel
August 31, 2018	Bratislava	Slovakia	Ondrej Nepela Arena	—
September 1, 2018	Graz	Austria	Stadthalle Graz	Don Broco
September 5, 2018	Hanover	Germany	TUI Arena	Don Broco
September 6, 2018	Esch-sur-Alzette	Luxembourg	Rockhal	Tuys
September 8, 2018 (Note: This concert is a part of Milano Rocks.)	Milan	Italia	Expo Arena	Mike Shinoda
September 11, 2018	Braga	Portugal	Braga Forum	—
September 12, 2018 (Note: The concert in Lisbon was originally planned to take place on a smaller venue, Campo Pequeno, but was rescheduled due to unavoidable commitments in the United States.)	Lisbon	Portugal	Altice Arena	—
September 15, 2018 (Note: This concert is a part of Music Midtown.)	Atlanta	United States	Piedmont Park	—
September 27, 2018	São Paulo	Brazil	Espaço das Américas	—
September 29, 2018	Porto Alegre	Brazil	Pepsi on Stage	—
September 30, 2018	Curitiba	Brazil	Teatro Positivo	—
October 2, 2018	Santiago	Chile	Movistar Arena	—
October 4, 2018	Montevideo	Uruguay	Landia Centro de Espectáculos	—
October 6, 2018	Buenos Aires	Argentina	Gimnasia y Esgrima de Buenos Aires	—
October 9, 2018	Guatemala City	Guatemala	Forum Majadas	Pako Rodríguez
October 11, 2018	Mexico City	Mexico	Mexico City Arena	Fer Casillas
October 13, 2018	Guadalajara	Mexico	Telmex Auditorium	Fer Casillas
December 5, 2018 (Note: This concert is a part of KXTE Holiday Havoc.)	Las Vegas	United States	Park MGM	—
December 6, 2018 (Note: This concert is a part of KKDO's Electric Christmas.)	Sacramento	United States	Golden 1 Center	—
December 8, 2018 (Note: This concert is a part of KROQ Almost Acoustic Christmas.)	Inglewood	United States	The Forum	—
December 9, 2018 (Note: This concert is a part of KBZT's Not So Silent Night.)	Del Mar	United States	Del Mar Fairgrounds	—

List of 2019 concerts, showing date, city, country, venue and opening acts
Date	City	Country	Venue	Opening acts
June 30, 2019 (Note: This concert is a part of Castle Clam Festival.)	Klam	Austria	Burg Clam	Krautschädl
July 3, 2019 (Note: This concert is a part of Rock in Roma.)	Rome	Italy	Parco della Musica	—
July 4, 2019 (Note: This concert is a part of Postepay Sound Padova.)	Padua	Italy	Geox Arena	—
July 6, 2019 (Note: This concert is a part of Pistoia Blues Festival.)	Pistoia	Italy	Piazza del Duomo	—
July 7, 2019 (Note: This concert is a part of Collisioni Festival.)	Barolo	Italy	Langhe	—
July 8, 2019 (Note: This concert is a part of Les Déferlantes Festival.)	Argelès-sur-Mer	France	Parc de Valmy	—
July 11, 2019 (Note: This concert is a part of Musilac Music Festival.)	Aix-les-Bains	France	Lac du Bourget	—
July 13, 2019 (Note: This concert is a part of Park Live Festival.)	Moscow	Russia	Gorky Park	—
July 15, 2019	Minsk	Belarus	Čyžoŭka-Arena	—
July 17, 2019 (Note: This concert is a part of UPark Festival.)	Kyiv	Ukraine	Sky Family Park	—
July 19, 2019 (Note: This concert is a part of Deichbrand.)	Cuxhaven	Germany	Sea-Airport Cuxhaven/Nordholz	—
July 21, 2019 (Note: This concert is a part of Electric Castle.)	Bonțida	Romania	Bánffy Castle	—
July 23, 2019	Budapest	Hungary	Budapest Park Open Air	—
July 25, 2019	Słupsk	Poland	Dolina Charlotty Amphitheater	—
July 27, 2019 (Note: This concert is a part of Qstock.)	Oulu	Finland	Kuusisaari	—
August 1, 2019	Vigo	Spain	Auditorio do Parque de Castrelos	—
August 3, 2019	Borriana	Spain	Arenal Sound	—
August 6, 2019 (Note: This concert is a part of City Sounds.)	Amsterdam	Netherlands	NDSM-werf	—
August 8, 2019 (Note: This concert is a part of Smukfest.)	Skanderborg	Denmark	Bøgeskoven	—
August 9, 2019	Šibenik	Croatia	Mars Island Croatia	—
August 13, 2019	Shekvetili	Georgia	Black Sea Arena	—
August 15, 2019	Mönchengladbach	Germany	Warsteiner HockeyPark	
August 16, 2019	Uberlingen	Germany	Schloss Salem	
August 17, 2019 (Note: This concert is a part of Highfield Festival.)	Großpösna	Germany	Störmthaler See	
