= Dangerous Night =

Single by Thirty Seconds to Mars

from the album America
- Released: January 25, 2018
- Studio: The International Centre for the Advancement of the Arts and Sciences of Sound (Los Angeles, California)
- Genre: Electronic rock
- Length: 3:19
- Label: Interscope; Universal
- Songwriters: Jared Leto; Stevie Aiello
- Producers: Zedd; Jared Leto

Thirty Seconds to Mars singles chronology
"Walk on Water" (2017)	"Dangerous Night" (2018)	"Rescue Me" (2018)

"Dangerous Night" is a song recorded by American rock band Thirty Seconds to Mars, featured on their fifth studio album America. It was written by Stevie Aiello and Jared Leto, who also produced the song with Zedd. "Dangerous Night" was described as a personal and uplifting song characterized by an anthemic and euphoric nature. It marked a strong departure from much of the band's previous work as it incorporates a softer sound as well as elements from electronic dance music. The song is imbued with influences from arena rock and ambient music.

"Dangerous Night" was released on January 25, 2018 through Interscope Records, as the second single from the album. Thirty Seconds to Mars performed the song on The Late Show with Stephen Colbert. KROQ ranked "Dangerous Night" at number 16 on its list of the 20 Best Songs of 2018.

== Background ==
"Dangerous Night" was written by lead vocalist Jared Leto and studio musician Stevie Aiello. It was produced by Leto and Zedd, who also did the mixing of the track. Zedd had previously worked with Thirty Seconds to Mars on a live rendition of his song "Stay the Night". Ryan Shanahan served as mixing assistant. "Dangerous Night" was recorded at The International Centre for the Advancement of the Arts and Sciences of Sound in Los Angeles, California.

On January 23, 2018, Thirty Seconds to Mars announced that "Dangerous Night" would be the second single from their upcoming fifth studio album. The song premiered on Zane Lowe's radio show of Beats 1 in London on January 25, 2018. It became commercially available for downloading shortly afterwards.

== Composition ==
"Dangerous Night" is imbued with influences and elements from electronic dance music and arena rock. It is opened by an ambient introduction, followed by the sound of synthesizers and digital drums. After the first verse, characterized by electronic dance beats, the pre-chorus follows, leading to an anthemic chorus featuring prominent use of guitars, drums and synths. Randy Holmes from ABC Radio called it "more of a personal song" compared to the band's previous works, although he noted that it retained its euphoric and anthemic nature. A CBS Radio writer noted the uplifting tone of the track, calling it an "arena-ready rock anthem".

Nina Braca from Billboard acknowledged the band's stylistic change, considering the song a departure from the group's previous hard rock sounds. She called it a "beat-driven" song, noticing "skittering" beats, "prominent" synths and Leto's "signature vocals". Stephen Ackroyd from Upset magazine called the track "typically shiny" and found it "aiming for anthem status".

== Live performances ==
Thirty Seconds to Mars performed the song live for the first time at The Late Show with Stephen Colbert on January 25, 2018. Their performance was filmed through the use of advanced robotic cameras which changed frames following the beat of the track, and featured an interpretive dancer. Shannon Leto was not present at the show and the song was performed by Jared Leto, Tomo Miličević and Stevie Aiello. Nicholas Rice from Billboard commended the band's performance, praising its visuals and calling it "one-of-a-kind".

Thirty Seconds to Mars performed the song live at The Late Late Show with James Corden on May 21, 2018. Their performance featured two actors portraying Donald Trump and Kim Jong-un involved in a ballroom dance.

== Charts ==
=== Weekly charts ===
Weekly chart performance for "Dangerous Night"
Chart (2018)	Peak position
Australia Digital Tracks (ARIA)	28
Austria (Ö3 Austria Top 40)	53
Belgium (Ultratip Bubbling Under Flanders)	20
Belgium (Ultratip Bubbling Under Wallonia)	28
Canada Digital Songs (Billboard)	40
Czech Republic (Rádio Top 100)	56
France (SNEP)	117
Germany (GfK)	78
Italy (Radio Top 40)	8
New Zealand Heatseekers (RMNZ)	10
Scottish Singles Sales (Official Charts)	59
Slovakia (Rádio Top 100)	68
Switzerland (Schweizer Hitparade)	66
UK Singles Sales (OCC)	57
UK Singles Downloads (Official Charts)	57
UK Rock & Metal (Official Charts)	4
US Digital Song Sales (Billboard)	36
US Hot Rock & Alternative Songs (Billboard)	8
US Rock & Alternative Airplay (Billboard)	4

=== Year-end charts ===
Year-end chart performance for "Dangerous Night"
Chart (2018)	Position
Italy (Radio Top 40)	40
US Hot Rock & Alternative Songs (Billboard)	37
US Rock Airplay (Billboard)	22

== Certifications ==
Certifications for "Dangerous Night"
Region	Certification	Certified units/sales
Italy (FIMI)	Gold	25,000^{‡}
^{‡} Sales+streaming figures based on certification alone.
