= Walk on Water (Thirty Seconds to Mars song) =

Single by Thirty Seconds to Mars

from the album America
- Released: August 22, 2017
- Studio: The International Centre for the Advancement of the Arts and Sciences of Sound (Los Angeles, California)
- Genre: Electronic rock; arena rock
- Length: 3:08
- Label: Interscope; Universal
- Songwriters: Jared Leto; Shannon Leto
- Producer: Jared Leto

Thirty Seconds to Mars singles chronology
"City of Angels" (2013)	"Walk on Water" (2017)	"Dangerous Night" (2018)

Music video
- "Walk on Water" on YouTube

"Walk on Water" is a song recorded by American rock band Thirty Seconds to Mars, featured on their fifth studio album America. It was produced by lead vocalist Jared Leto, who wrote the song alongside drummer Shannon Leto, with production contributions from Stevie Aiello, Arkadi Zaslavski and Mike Elizondo, among others.

It was recorded at the International Centre for the Advancement of the Arts and Sciences of Sound in Los Angeles, California. "Walk on Water" was released on August 22, 2017 through Interscope Records, as the lead single from the album.

== Release ==
On August 14, 2017, Thirty Seconds to Mars announced that "Walk on Water" would be the lead single from their upcoming fifth studio album. Jared Leto told NME that the song required a long period of time to record. "Walk on Water" marks the first work by Thirty Seconds to Mars to be released by Interscope, after the band parted from Virgin due to tumultuous years with the label.

On August 22, "Walk on Water" made its radio debut and became commercially available for downloading. A lyric video for the song was released on YouTube the same day. Music website Genius premiered the lyrics of the song on August 21, 2017, a day prior to the single's official release. "Walk on Water" was used by ESPN as the promotional theme for the network's coverage of the 2017 College Football season.

== Composition ==
"Walk on Water" is an electronic rock song with influences and elements from gospel music and arena rock. It opens with a vocal chanted part followed by the sounds of digital drums and guitars, with a heavy bassline. During the first verse, Leto voices the lines "Can you even see what you're fighting for? / Bloodlust and a holy war / Listen up, hear the patriots shout: / Times are changing". The full-throated chorus then follows, which features heavy use of drums, synthesizers and guitars. The song's bridge is characterized by call-and-response verses performed by a gospel ensemble.

Leto called "Walk on Water" an "ever so subtle and minimalist ode". He described it as "a song for everybody due to its universal message." The track's lyrics deal "with such topics as freedom, persistence, change and fighting for what one believes in." In an interview with Loudwire, Leto depicted the song as a "call to arms but also full of all the optimism and hope that is such an integral part of the American Dream". Jon Blistein from Rolling Stone acknowledged a slight political edge in the song's lyrics. Nick Reilly of NME noted that "Walk on Water" dissects the general condition of the United States and calls for unity in the nation. In her review for Fuse, Bianca Gracie felt that the song serves as a call to arms to fight collectively for change.

== Music video ==
After several weeks of editing, the band premiered the official music video for "Walk on Water" on November 8, 2017. It was directed by Jared Leto and features user-submitted footage from July 4, 2017, depicting Independence Day in the United States. Thirty Seconds to Mars also utilized their own crews to compile additional footage, all of which is part of a documentary film titled A Day in the Life of America, released in 2019.

== Critical reception ==
Michael Christopher from Loudwire gave the song a positive review, calling it an "anthemic, electronically tinged track" which features "sweeping music" and "even grander lyrics" that fit the political climate of the period. Gil Kaufman from Billboard commended the song's "anthemic chorus" and "heart-stirring, propulsive rhythm". Jon Blistein from Rolling Stone called it a "sweeping" song, noticing "marching drums" and "booming synths". Nick Reilly from NME was impressed with the track, labelling it a "rousing call to arms". A Kerrang! writer called the song a "pretty powerful offering" and praised its lyrics, noting that they call for people to "come together rather than building walls". Markos Papadatos, writing for Digital Journal, rated it an "A", labelling it an "empowering song", and commended the band's musicianship and Leto's "rich and captivating" vocals. Bianca Gracie from Fuse noted the track's "commanding chorus" and lauded its political message. Deepa Lakshmin from MTV commended the song's "fiery lyrics" and named "Walk on Water" a "powerful anthem" which is "equal parts inspirational and motivational".

== Live performances ==
The song was performed live for the first time at the 2017 MTV Video Music Awards on August 27 with Travis Scott as a special surprise guest, who performed the chorus from his hit song "Butterfly Effect". The band played "Walk on Water" at the Rock in Rio festival on September 24, 2017, featuring Brazilian rapper Projota. They later performed the song at the LOS40 Music Awards 2017 on November 10. An acoustic rendition of the track was performed on BBC Radio 1's Live Lounge and during The Ellen DeGeneres Show. The song is also used in the PFL as the intro theme.

== Credits and personnel ==
Recording and management

- Recorded at The International Centre for the Advancement of the Arts and Sciences of Sound, Los Angeles, California
- Published by Apocraphex Music (ASCAP) / Universal Music – Z Tunes, LLC (ASCAP)
- All rights administered by Universal Music – Z Tunes, LLC

Personnel

- Thirty Seconds to Mars – primary artist
- Jared Leto – songwriter, producer
- Shannon Leto – songwriter
- Stevie Aiello – engineer, additional producer
- Neal Avron – audio mixing
- Sam de Jong – additional producer
- Mike Elizondo – additional producer
- Jordan Galvan – engineer, additional producer
- Heavy Mellow – additional producer
- Pete Nappi – additional producer
- Scott Skrzynski – mixing assistant
- Arkadi Zaslavski – additional producer

Credits and personnel adapted from Qobuz listing.

== Charts ==
=== Weekly charts ===
Weekly chart performance for "Walk on Water"
Chart (2017–2018)	Peak position
Australia (ARIA)	99
Austria (Ö3 Austria Top 40)	38
Belgium (Ultratop 50 Flanders)	46
Belgium (Ultratip Bubbling Under Wallonia)	21
Canada Digital Songs (Billboard)	29
Canada Rock (Billboard)	11
Czech Republic (Rádio Top 100)	2
Finland Download (Latauslista)	19
France (SNEP)	54
Germany (GfK)	84
Netherlands (Dutch Top 40)	50
Poland Airplay (ZPAV)	16
Scottish Singles Sales (Official Charts)	34
Slovakia (Rádio Top 100)	20
Spain (Promusicae)	23
Switzerland (Schweizer Hitparade)	63
UK Singles (Official Charts)	87
UK Rock & Metal (Official Charts)	1
US Bubbling Under Hot 100 (Billboard)	6
US Digital Song Sales (Billboard)	26
US Digital Song Sales (Billboard)	26
US Hot Rock & Alternative Songs (Billboard)	5
US Rock & Alternative Airplay (Billboard)	1
US Pop Airplay (Billboard)	31

=== Year-end charts ===
2017 year-end chart performance for "Walk on Water"
Chart (2017)	Position
US Hot Rock Songs (Billboard)	32
US Rock Airplay (Billboard)	36

2018 year-end chart performance for "Walk on Water"
Chart (2018)	Position
US Hot Rock Songs (Billboard)	18
US Rock Airplay (Billboard)	14

== Certifications ==
Certifications for "Walk on Water"
Region	Certification	Certified units/sales
Brazil (Pro-Música Brasil)	Gold	30,000^{‡}
Canada (Music Canada)	Gold	40,000^{‡}
Germany (BVMI)	Gold	200,000^{‡}
United States (RIAA)	Gold	500,000^{‡}
^{‡} Sales+streaming figures based on certification alone.
