= America (Thirty Seconds to Mars album) =

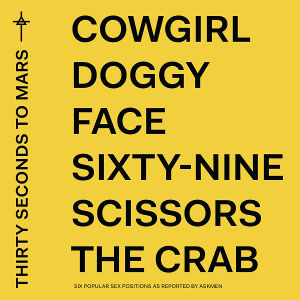
- One of ten covers created for the album. This is the cover used on the Apple Music release of the album.

Studio album by Thirty Seconds to Mars
- Released: April 6, 2018
- Studios: The International Centre for the Advancement of the Arts and Sciences of Sound (Los Angeles, California)
- Genres: Electronica; art pop
- Length: 42:22
- Label: Interscope
- Producers: Tommy English; KillaGraham; Jared Leto; Robopop; Jamie Schefman; Yellow Claw; Zedd

Thirty Seconds to Mars chronology
Love, Lust, Faith and Dreams (2013)	America (2018)	It's the End of the World but It's a Beautiful Day (2023)

Singles from America
- 1. "Walk on Water" Released: August 22, 2017; 2. "Dangerous Night" Released: January 25, 2018; 3. "Rescue Me" Released: June 15, 2018

America (stylized in uppercase) is the fifth studio album by American rock band Thirty Seconds to Mars, released on April 6, 2018, through Interscope Records. It is their first album in five years, after Love, Lust, Faith and Dreams (2013), as well as their first and only release for Interscope, following the band's departure from Virgin Records in 2014. It is also the final album by the band to feature lead guitarist Tomo Miličević, who left the band two months after its release.

Produced by frontman Jared Leto alongside Yellow Claw, Zedd, Robopop, and others, the album represents a drastic shift from the experimental compositions of their previous efforts, opting for an electronic and art pop influenced sound. Lyrically, it is a concept album exploring themes such as politics, sex, and fame. The album was promoted with three singles – "Walk on Water", "Dangerous Night", and "Rescue Me" – in addition to the Monolith Tour and an accompanying documentary film, A Day in the Life of America (2019).

The album received polarized reviews from critics. Some commended the conceptual themes, while others felt that they were not fully developed; critics were also divided over the band's change in sound. Upon its release, America debuted at number two on the US Billboard 200, becoming the band's highest entry on the chart, and reached the top five in several other countries.

== Background ==
Thirty Seconds to Mars released their fourth studio album Love, Lust, Faith and Dreams in May 2013. The album, produced by frontman Jared Leto and previous collaborator Steve Lillywhite, marked a shift in the band's musical direction from an alternative rock sound, recognized with A Beautiful Lie (2005) and This Is War (2009), to a more experimental and electronic-influenced sound. The band parted ways with Virgin Records in 2014 after tumultuous years with the label, and later signed with Interscope.

The group began preparations for new music in November 2015, with Leto expressing his desire to experiment and explore new musical grounds. Additionally, Leto started working on the documentary film A Day in the Life of America, which was conceived as a companion piece to the band's fifth album. The film includes user-submitted footage from July 4, 2017, depicting Independence Day in the United States. It was released in January 2021 on PBS after premiering at the 2019 Tribeca Film Festival. The band later embarked on a promotional tour with Muse and PVRIS, which was one of the highest-grossing North American tours of 2017, according to Pollstar's annual year-end tour chart.

While touring, Thirty Seconds to Mars announced "Walk on Water" as the lead single from the album. Critics acknowledged a slight political edge in the song's lyrics, inspired by the election of Donald Trump as President of the United States. The song earned the band an MTV Europe Music Award for Best Alternative. While collecting the award, Jared Leto made a remark at Trump's immigration policy as he stated, "We are Americans – a land of immigrants – and we just want to say that we welcome you with open arms and with open hearts, and we love you."

== Promotion ==
America was first announced by the band in February 2018 under a placeholder name, alongside the North American leg of The Monolith Tour. Tickets for the tour, including the previously announced European leg, were sold with a copy of the album, to be delivered upon its release on April 6, 2018. A presale of tickets were offered to people that had pre-ordered the album before February 12. America was officially unveiled by the band and Interscope Records on March 22, 2018. It was unveiled with an advertising campaign featuring billboards and posters reproducing the album's art direction and design. Billboards were located at landmark locations such as Sunset Boulevard in Los Angeles, New York City's Times Square, and outside of a number of London Underground stations. A listening session for the album took place on April 3 at the Rock and Roll Hall of Fame and Museum in Cleveland.

=== Singles ===
On August 22, 2017, Interscope released "Walk on Water" as the lead single promoting the then-unannounced fifth studio album by the band. The song was performed live for the first time at the 2017 MTV Video Music Awards on August 27 with Travis Scott as a special surprise guest. A music video for the song premiered on Vevo on November 8, 2017, featuring footage from the documentary film A Day in the Life of America. "Walk on Water" was used by ESPN as the promotional theme for the network's coverage of the 2017 College Football season.

"Dangerous Night" was released as the second single from the album on January 25, 2018, after it premiered on Zane Lowe's radio show of Beats 1 in London. The band debuted the song live the same day at The Late Show with Stephen Colbert. Their performance was filmed through the use of advanced robotic cameras which changed frames following the beat of the track, and featured an interpretive dancer. Nicholas Rice from Billboard commended the band's performance, praising its visuals and calling it "one-of-a-kind".

"Rescue Me" was released as the third single from the album on June 15, 2018. The official music video premiered three days earlier. On May 27, 2018, the band were joined on stage by Shawn Mendes to perform the song at BBC Music's Biggest Weekend.

== Packaging ==
The art direction and design for the album were handled by Willo Perron and Jared Leto. America features multiple album covers featuring an array of lists of words that reflect the themes of the album, including the most prescribed drugs, iconic American names, the most valuable trademarks, popular sex positions (the cover displayed in this article), recognizable abbreviated agencies, most dangerous sports, highest paid YouTubers and generally hot topics of discussion. Thirty Seconds to Mars also launched a custom album cover generator allowing fans to create their own custom lists in the format of the America album cover. Leto explained, "For me the lists are almost like a time capsule. Independently they may surprise, entertain or provoke, but as a group they give us a sense of the culture we are a part of and the times we are living in."

== Critical reception ==
Professional ratings
Aggregate scores
Source	Rating
Metacritic	47/100
Review scores
Source	Rating
AllMusic	3/5 stars
Alternative Addiction	3.5/5 stars
Belfast Telegraph	8/10
Contactmusic	3.5/5 stars
Kerrang!	2/5
The Music	4/5 stars
Q	2/5 stars
The Record	8/10
Spin	5/10

America received polarized reviews from music critics. Many commentators commended the album's conceptual execution, while others believed that its underlying concept was not fully developed. Critics also debated the stylistic change in the band's sound. At Metacritic, which assigns a normalized rating out of 100 to reviews from mainstream critics, the album has an average score of 47 based on four reviews, indicating "mixed or average reviews". Neil Z. Yeung from AllMusic described America as a "bold and risky move" from the band, calling it as "vast and polarizing" as the country after which it is named. Katie Wattendorf, writing for The Cavalier Daily, gave America a positive review, praising the album's concept and calling it "as diverse as the country itself". She commented that the album addresses recent history in the United States not just "by mentioning the political climate, or the violence, or the technology takeover — but by posing a solution in the form of unity through differences, cohesion through variety". Aneta Grulichova from The Music magazine awarded the album four stars out of five and praised the band's stylistic change, noting that the record incorporates a softer sound as well as elements from techno.

Spin's Al Shipley, who gave the album a mixed review, felt that the energy and volume found in the band's signature style was replaced with "fairly tame looped and programmed beats and ominous synths", although he praised the abrupt ending to the song "Rider", describing it as "a rare glimpse at a Thirty Seconds to Mars that's willing to subvert expectations". Both Q and Kerrang! gave America a mixed review, with the former calling the album "unsubtle, self-important and not half as good as it thinks it is", while the latter called it "an odd album, one that requires patience to unlock."

== Track listing ==
No.	Title	Writer(s)	Producer(s)	Length
1.	"Walk on Water"	Jared Leto	J. Leto	3:05
2.	"Dangerous Night"	J. Leto; Stevie Aiello	Zedd; J. Leto	3:19
3.	"Rescue Me"	J. Leto; Graham Muron	KillaGraham; J. Leto	3:37
4.	"One Track Mind" (featuring ASAP Rocky)	J. Leto; Rakim Mayers; Daniel Omelio	Robopop; J. Leto	4:20
5.	"Monolith"	J. Leto	J. Leto	1:38
6.	"Love Is Madness" (featuring Halsey)	J. Leto; Ashley Nicolette Frangipane	J. Leto; Jamie Schefman	3:54
7.	"Great Wide Open"	J. Leto	J. Leto	4:49
8.	"Hail to the Victor"	J. Leto; Aiello; Jim Taihuttu; Nils Rondhuis; Thom Van Der Bruggen	J. Leto; Yellow Claw	3:22
9.	"Dawn Will Rise"	J. Leto	Schefman; J. Leto	3:57
10.	"Remedy"	Shannon Leto; Aiello	J. Leto	3:17
11.	"Live Like a Dream"	J. Leto	J. Leto	4:06
12.	"Rider"	J. Leto	Tommy English; J. Leto	2:58
Total length:				42:22

America – Deluxe edition (bonus tracks)
No.	Title	Writer(s)	Producer(s)	Length
13.	"Walk on Water" (acoustic version)	J. Leto	J. Leto	3:08
14.	"Walk on Water" (R3hab remix)	J. Leto	J. Leto	2:41
15.	"Dangerous Night" (Cheat Codes remix)	J. Leto; Aiello	Zedd; J. Leto	3:02
Total length:				51:13

America – Japanese edition (bonus track)
No.	Title	Writer(s)	Producer(s)	Length
4.	"One Track Mind" (solo version)	J. Leto; Mayers; Omelio	Robopop; J. Leto	3:55
16.	"One Track Mind" (featuring ASAP Rocky)	J. Leto; Mayers; Omelio	Robopop; J. Leto	4:20
Total length:				55:33

== Personnel ==
Credits adapted from Qobuz.

- Stevie Aiello – composition (tracks 2, 8, 10)
- ASAP Rocky – composition (track 4), vocals (track 4)
- Alice Aufray – background vocals (track 12)
- Neal Avron – audio mixing (tracks 1, 7, 11)
- William Binderup – mixing assistance (tracks 9, 12)
- Will Borza – mastering assistance
- Scott Desmarais – mixing assistance (tracks 3, 6)
- Tommy English – production (track 12)
- Robin Florent – mixing assistance (tracks 3, 6)
- Chris Galland – mix engineering (tracks 3, 6)
- Jordan Galvan – audio mixing (tracks 5, 10)
- Şerban Ghenea – audio mixing (track 4)
- Halsey – composition (track 6), vocals (track 6)
- John Hanes – mixing assistance (track 4)
- KillaGraham – composition (track 3), production (track 3)
- Rob Kinelski – audio mixing (track 8)
- Jared Leto – composition (except track 10), production, art direction, design
- Shannon Leto – composition (track 10), vocals (track 10)
- Erik Madrid – audio mixing (tracks 9, 12)
- Manny Marroquin – audio mixing (tracks 3, 6)
- Willo Perron & Brian Roettinger;– art direction, design
- Robopop – composition (track 4), production (track 4)
- Jamie Schefman – production (tracks 6, 9)
- Ryan Shanahan – mixing assistance (track 2)
- Scott Skrzynski – mixing assistance (tracks 1, 7, 11)
- Thom Van Der Bruggen – composition (track 8)
- Howie Weinberg – audio mastering
- Yellow Claw – composition (track 8), production (track 8)
- Zedd – production (track 2), audio mixing (track 2)

== Charts ==
=== Weekly charts ===
Weekly chart performance for America
Chart (2018)	Peak position
Australian Albums (ARIA)	10
Austrian Albums (Ö3 Austria)	1
Belgian Albums (Ultratop Flanders)	6
Belgian Albums (Ultratop Wallonia)	7
Canadian Albums (Billboard)	3
Czech Albums (ČNS IFPI)	4
Dutch Albums (Album Top 100)	14
Estonian Albums (IFPI)	7
Finnish Albums (Suomen virallinen lista)	13
French Albums (SNEP)	29
German Albums (Offizielle Top 100)	1
Greek Albums (IFPI Greece)	11
Irish Albums (Official Charts)	15
Italian Albums (FIMI)	2
New Zealand Albums (RMNZ)	36
Norwegian Albums (VG-lista)	20
Polish Albums (ZPAV)	4
Portuguese Albums (AFP)	2
Russian Albums (NFPF)	2
Scottish Albums (Official Charts)	4
Slovak Albums (ČNS IFPI)	8
Spanish Albums (Promusicae)	9
Swedish Albums (Sverigetopplistan)	24
Swiss Albums (Schweizer Hitparade)	2
UK Albums (Official Charts)	4
US Billboard 200	2
US Top Alternative Albums (Billboard)	1
US Top Rock Albums (Billboard)	1

=== Year-end charts ===
Year-end chart performance for America
Chart (2018)	Position
German Albums (Offizielle Top 100)	99
UK Cassette Albums (OCC)	11
US Top Current Album Sales (Billboard)	104
US Top Alternative Albums (Billboard)	34
US Top Rock Albums (Billboard)	67

== Certifications ==
Certifications for America
Region	Certification	Certified units/sales
Russia (NFPF)	Gold	5,000^{*}
^{*} Sales figures based on certification alone.
