= Shannon Leto =

American drummer (born 1970)

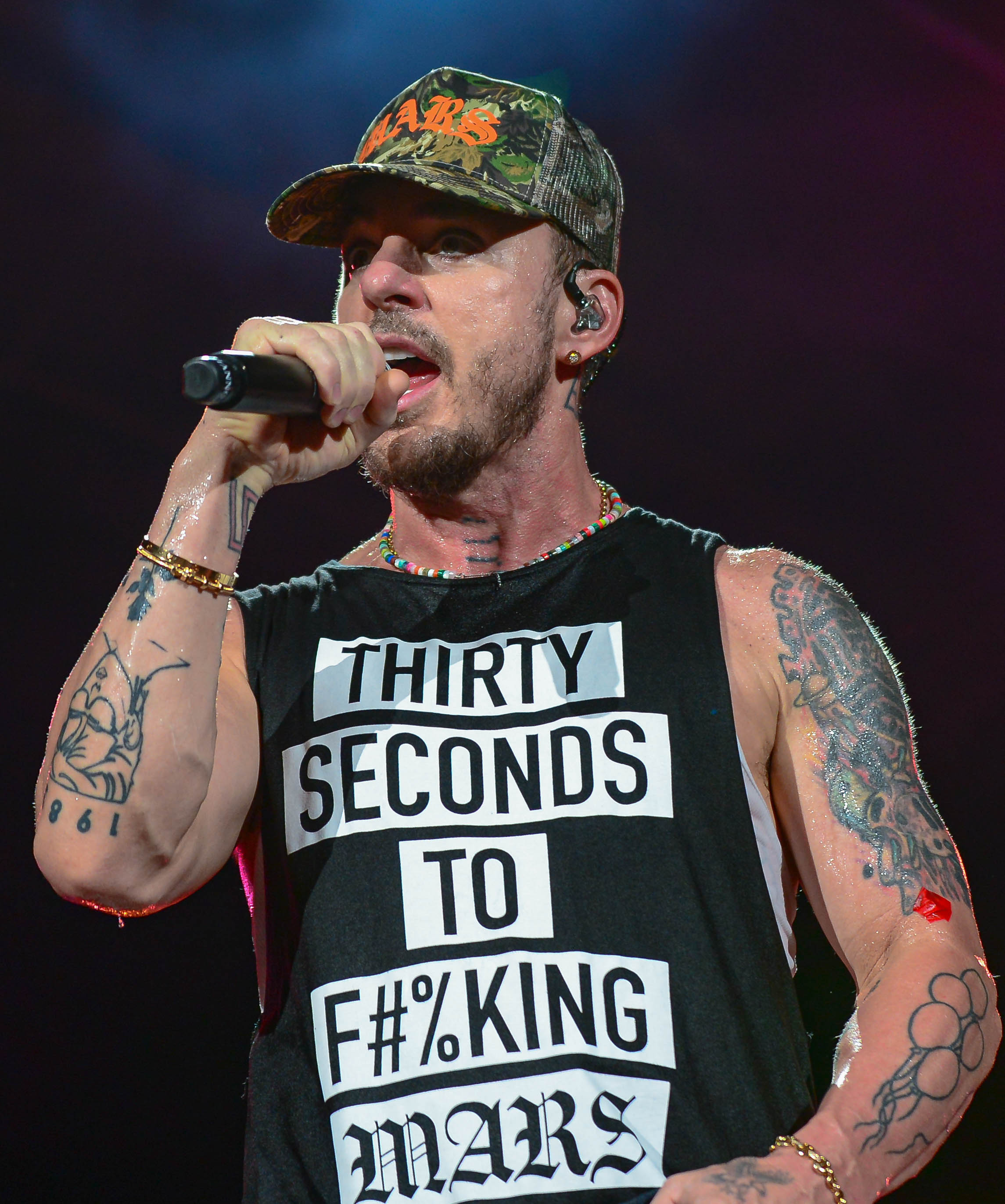
- Leto in 2024
- Born: March 9, 1970 (age 56); Bossier City, Louisiana, U.S.
- Occupation: Musician
- Spouse: Cara Santana (m. 2025)
- Relatives: Jared Leto (brother)
- Musical career
- Genres: Alternative rock
- Instruments: Drums; percussion; vocals
- Works: Discography; songs recorded
- Labels: Universal; Interscope; Virgin; EMI; Immortal
- Member of: Thirty Seconds to Mars

Shannon Leto (/ˈlɛtoʊ/ LET-oh; born March 9, 1970) is an American musician best known as the drummer of rock band Thirty Seconds to Mars. He co-founded the group in 1998 in Los Angeles, California, with his younger brother Jared. Their debut album, 30 Seconds to Mars (2002), was released to positive reviews but only to limited success. The band achieved worldwide fame with the release of their second album A Beautiful Lie (2005). Their following releases, This Is War (2009) and Love, Lust, Faith and Dreams (2013), received further critical and commercial success. As of September 2014, the band has sold over 15 million albums worldwide.

Leto has worked on several side projects during his career, including a collaboration with Antoine Becks, a recording with the short-lived supergroup The Wondergirls, and performing on occasional dates with Street Drum Corps. His creative contribution to music has received praise from musicians and critics. He is noted for his dynamic drumming style and his energetic live performances.

== Early life ==
Shannon was born in Bossier City, Louisiana, to Constance (née Metrejon). His mother has Cajun ancestry. (Leto is the surname of his stepfather, Dr. Carl Leto, an ophthalmologist.) His parents divorced when he was a child, and he and his younger brother, Jared, lived with their mother and their maternal grandparents, William Lee Metrejon and Ruby Russell. His biological father remarried and died by suicide when Shannon was ten years old. Leto moved frequently with his family from his native Louisiana around the country. He has two younger half-brothers from his father's second marriage.

Leto's mother joined the hippie movement and encouraged her sons to get involved in the arts. Leto became interested in percussion from the moment he and his brother started playing music together at an early age, and his models were artists of many mediums. "I come from a pretty artistic family," he explained, "There were canvases and paint everywhere, instruments, and all sorts of stuff. It just kind of made sense. I started playing on pots and pans at a very early age, so I just kind of flowed into it. It was just a natural progression." He received his first drum kit when he was ten years old and began teaching himself, developing his own style.

Shannon Leto has described his adolescence as a troubled time, in which he used drugs and dropped out of school. He said, "I was in a mess, I felt I didn't belong anywhere", calling himself as an "outsider" who hated conformity and rules, and "took any opportunity to break them." Ultimately, Jared helped him recover from drugs.

== Music career ==
Leto formed the rock band Thirty Seconds to Mars in 1998 in Los Angeles, California with his brother Jared. Their debut album had been in the works for a couple of years and was recorded in rural Wyoming during 2001 and early 2002. Their work led to a number of record labels being interested in signing Thirty Seconds to Mars, which eventually signed to Immortal Records. The band worked with producers Bob Ezrin and Brian Virtue on their debut album 30 Seconds to Mars, which was released on August 27, 2002, in the United States through Immortal and Virgin. It reached number 107 on the US Billboard 200 and number one on the US Top Heatseekers. Upon its release, 30 Seconds to Mars was met with mostly positive reviews; music critic Megan O'Toole felt that the band has "managed to carve out a unique niche for themselves in the rock realm." The album was a slow-burning success, and eventually sold two million copies worldwide as of March 2011.

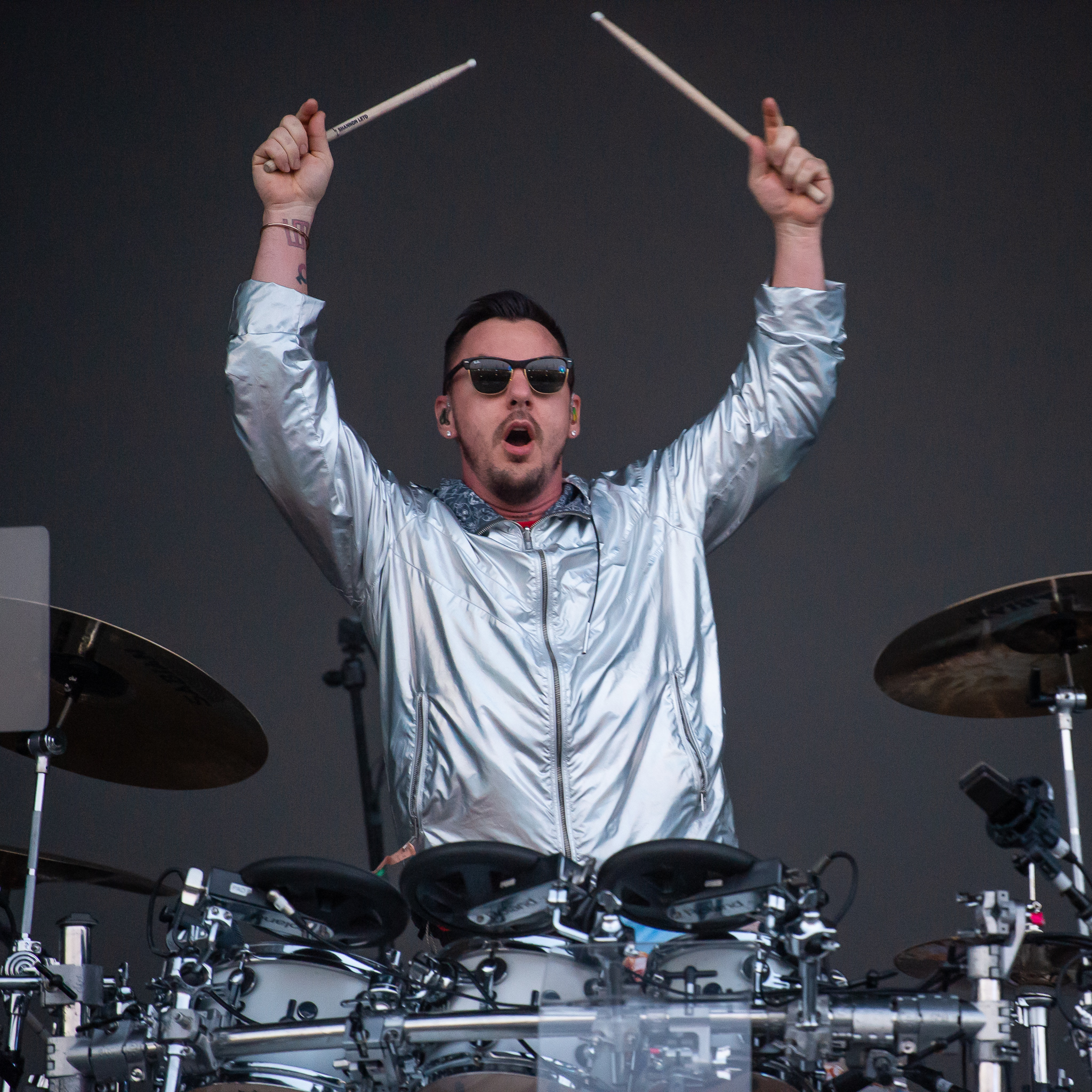
Leto with Thirty Seconds to Mars in 2018

It took two years to record their next release A Beautiful Lie, with the band traveling to four continents to accommodate Jared Leto's acting career. A Beautiful Lie was released on August 30, 2005, in the United States. It has since been certified platinum by the Recording Industry Association of America (RIAA), and has reached platinum and gold status in several countries, with a sales total of over four million. The band heavily toured in support of the album and played at several major festivals, including Roskilde, Pinkpop, Rock am Ring, and Download.

In August 2008, during the recording process of the band's third studio album, Thirty Seconds to Mars attempted to sign with a new label, prompting EMI (the parent label of Virgin), to file a $30 million breach of contract lawsuit. After nearly a year of legal battles, the band announced on April 28, 2009, that the suit had been settled following a defence based on the De Havilland Law. Thirty Seconds to Mars then signed a new contract with EMI and released their third album This Is War in December 2009 to critical acclaim.

This Is War reached the top ten of several national album charts and earned numerous music awards. The band began their Into the Wild Tour in February 2010 and was among the hardest-working touring artists of the year. In December 2011, they entered the Guinness World Records for most live shows during a single album cycle, with 300 shows. In September 2012, Leto released a remixed version of "Night of the Hunter", a track featured on This Is War. The musician explained that he wanted to "reinvent" the song, to "shed a different light on it by bringing a dance element to it."

Thirty Seconds to Mars released their fourth album, Love, Lust, Faith and Dreams, in May 2013 through Universal. It received generally positive reviews and reached the top ten in more than fifteen countries, including the United Kingdom and the United States. The band promoted the album by embarking on their Love, Lust, Faith and Dreams Tour and the Carnivores Tour, co-headlining with Linkin Park. In April 2014, Thirty Seconds to Mars announced that they have parted from Virgin Records after tumultuous years with the label.

== Artistry ==
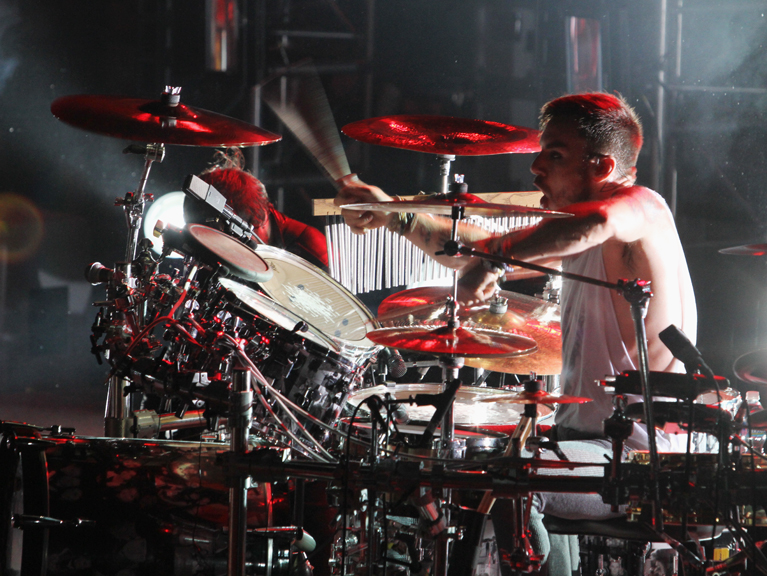
Leto performing in 2010

Leto is known for his energetic live performances and his ability to blend traditional and experimental drum techniques. During the production of Thirty Seconds to Mars first studio album, he played almost exclusively electronic drums and drew influence from bands such as Pink Floyd, The Cure, Led Zeppelin, and The Who, which he considers "mostly big conceptional bands; bands that had depth; bands that were dynamic." Bob Ezrin, producer of the album, felt that Leto is "one of the most inventive drummers I've worked with. He isn't satisfied with simply adding a beat; his drum parts are an integral part of the orchestration of the record. He's also a great live drummer who is lots of fun to watch, with a presence and energy level that are mesmerizing."

Leto switched to a mostly acoustic set-up on the band's next release A Beautiful Lie. His equipment consists of a hybrid kit that combines both acoustic and electric elements. His drum technician Joseph Ciccone, better known as Kentucky, stated that Leto's "sound is his technique. He's an animal behind that kit, so I love giving him tons of things to beat up." During the production of This Is War, Leto widened his style with an abundance of electronic sounds and synth textures created by himself. He wrote the instrumental track "L490" and played every instrument on it, including all guitars and a singing bowl. He experimented with different instruments and drew influences from a varied range of styles in Love, Lust, Faith and Dreams. Steve Lillywhite, who co-produced two band's albums, felt that Leto treats drumming "unlike most drummers do in rock bands. His cross rhythms explode in a guttural way ... very musical, extremely unique."

Leto was largely an autodidact on drums; "I've always wanted to find my way of doing things," he explained, "Discovering what I can contribute with my own voice. There were so many styles that I was into at a young age. I didn't want to get locked into just one thing." During his youth, Leto had been a devoted fan of progressive rock and blues music, listening to artists such as Fleetwood Mac, Janis Joplin, Jimi Hendrix, Pink Floyd, Led Zeppelin, and Boz Scaggs. He is inspired by electronic music, including Depeche Mode and The Cure. His major influences also include jazz band Steely Dan, as well as heavy metal groups Mountain, Iron Maiden and Kiss. According to Leto, these artists were commercially viable but also respected for their statements and contributions. He explained that he "never focused on the drummers," saying that he felt more connected to music than a particular drummer. When Thirty Seconds to Mars first started, the Leto brothers experimented to try and create a specific sound, whose process was described as "very organic". They were attempting to produce a "feeling" rather than a sound, in order to recreate the sense of community that marked their childhood. Leto also stated that the band's concerts are a direct reflection of that period of his early life.

Journalist Kelly King, a long-time contributor with Drumhead magazine, opined that Leto is "energy and grace behind the drums, stoking the fire that drives his band." He commented that the musician is both confident and aggressive on his kit, and felt that "his drive to push himself to the limit, to create and explore his own artistic capabilities is paramount." Ryan Jones, writing for Alternative Addiction, described Leto as one of rock's most dynamic drummers of present day. He received the Indie Drummer Award at the 2012 Drummies Awards. He was also nominated for Alternative Drummer in 2009 and 2011.

== Other work ==
In 1994, Leto found a minor role on the television series My So-Called Life, in which his brother starred. He later appeared in the films Prefontaine (1997), Sol Goode (2001), and Highway (2002). Leto recorded the songs "Drop That Baby" and "Let's Go All the Way" with the short-lived supergroup The Wondergirls in 1999, which members included Scott Weiland, Mark McGrath, and Ian Astbury, among others. Since 2007, Leto has performed on occasional dates with American percussion band Street Drum Corps. In June 2008, he joined Habitat for Humanity to work with Thirty Seconds to Mars on a home being repaired and renovated through the Greater Los Angeles Area's "A Brush With Kindness" program. Leto began producing American electronic band CB7 after meeting musician Antoine Becks in 2009. CB7 later supported Thirty Seconds to Mars on the North American leg of their Into the Wild Tour in 2011. The same year, Leto created a side project with Becks and toured worldwide with him until the summer of 2012, when the duo split. In 2014, Leto launched Black Fuel Trading Company, a lifestyle brand primarily focusing on responsibly sourced, direct-trade coffee.

== Discography ==
Thirty Seconds to Mars studio albums

- 30 Seconds to Mars (2002)
- A Beautiful Lie (2005)
- This Is War (2009)
- Love, Lust, Faith and Dreams (2013)
- America (2018)
- It's the End of the World but It's a Beautiful Day (2023)
